This is a partial list of unnumbered minor planets for principal provisional designations assigned during 1–15 October 2002. Since this period yielded a high number of provisional discoveries, it is further split into several standalone pages. , a total of 489 bodies remain unnumbered for this period. Objects for this year are listed on the following pages: A–B · C · D–F · G–K · L–O · P · Qi · Qii · Ri · Rii · S · Ti · Tii · U–V and W–Y. Also see previous and next year.

T 

|- id="2002 TG" bgcolor=#FA8072
| 0 || 2002 TG || MCA || 20.3 || data-sort-value="0.26" | 260 m || multiple || 2002–2020 || 14 Aug 2020 || 41 || align=left | Disc.: Ondřejov Obs. || 
|- id="2002 TB2" bgcolor=#E9E9E9
| – ||  || MBA-M || 17.3 || 1.0 km || single || 50 days || 20 Nov 2002 || 49 || align=left | Disc.: LONEOS || 
|- id="2002 TK7" bgcolor=#E9E9E9
| 0 ||  || MBA-M || 17.72 || 1.6 km || multiple || 2002–2022 || 25 Jan 2022 || 105 || align=left | Disc.: LONEOSAlt.: 2011 QP9 || 
|- id="2002 TO7" bgcolor=#fefefe
| 0 ||  || MBA-I || 16.9 || 1.2 km || multiple || 1992–2020 || 20 Jan 2020 || 329 || align=left | Disc.: LONEOSAlt.: 2011 KN12 || 
|- id="2002 TZ8" bgcolor=#FA8072
| – ||  || MCA || 18.0 || data-sort-value="0.75" | 750 m || single || 43 days || 28 Oct 2002 || 38 || align=left | Disc.: LINEAR || 
|- id="2002 TA9" bgcolor=#FA8072
| 1 ||  || MCA || 17.0 || 2.2 km || multiple || 2002–2020 || 09 Dec 2020 || 230 || align=left | Disc.: LINEAR || 
|- id="2002 TE12" bgcolor=#d6d6d6
| 1 ||  || MBA-O || 17.3 || 1.9 km || multiple || 2002–2019 || 02 Jan 2019 || 50 || align=left | Disc.: LONEOS || 
|- id="2002 TU12" bgcolor=#E9E9E9
| 1 ||  || MBA-M || 17.6 || data-sort-value="0.90" | 900 m || multiple || 2002–2020 || 14 Feb 2020 || 115 || align=left | Disc.: LONEOS || 
|- id="2002 TA13" bgcolor=#fefefe
| 0 ||  || MBA-I || 17.89 || data-sort-value="0.79" | 790 m || multiple || 2002–2021 || 09 Dec 2021 || 213 || align=left | Disc.: LONEOSAlt.: 2005 PD7 || 
|- id="2002 TW16" bgcolor=#E9E9E9
| 2 ||  || MBA-M || 18.44 || data-sort-value="0.86" | 610 m || multiple || 2002-2020 || 04 Jan 2020 || 34 || align=left | Disc.: LINEAR || 
|- id="2002 TB17" bgcolor=#E9E9E9
| 0 ||  || MBA-M || 17.23 || 1.1 km || multiple || 2002–2021 || 16 Apr 2021 || 107 || align=left | Disc.: LINEARAlt.: 2006 SK136 || 
|- id="2002 TO17" bgcolor=#E9E9E9
| 1 ||  || MBA-M || 17.8 || data-sort-value="0.82" | 820 m || multiple || 2001–2020 || 03 Feb 2020 || 69 || align=left | Disc.: LINEARAlt.: 2006 QD41 || 
|- id="2002 TZ17" bgcolor=#fefefe
| 0 ||  || MBA-I || 18.4 || data-sort-value="0.62" | 620 m || multiple || 2002–2019 || 19 Sep 2019 || 64 || align=left | Disc.: LINEAR || 
|- id="2002 TM18" bgcolor=#fefefe
| 0 ||  || MBA-I || 18.16 || data-sort-value="0.69" | 690 m || multiple || 2002–2021 || 08 Jun 2021 || 158 || align=left | Disc.: LINEAR || 
|- id="2002 TN18" bgcolor=#FA8072
| 0 ||  || MCA || 18.77 || data-sort-value="0.52" | 520 m || multiple || 2002–2021 || 07 Apr 2021 || 50 || align=left | Disc.: LINEAR || 
|- id="2002 TQ18" bgcolor=#fefefe
| 0 ||  || MBA-I || 17.9 || data-sort-value="0.78" | 780 m || multiple || 2002–2017 || 10 Dec 2017 || 116 || align=left | Disc.: LINEARAlt.: 2013 RZ72 || 
|- id="2002 TT18" bgcolor=#d6d6d6
| 0 ||  || MBA-O || 16.6 || 2.7 km || multiple || 2002–2018 || 16 Sep 2018 || 75 || align=left | Disc.: LINEAR || 
|- id="2002 TG21" bgcolor=#E9E9E9
| 0 ||  || MBA-M || 18.1 || data-sort-value="0.71" | 710 m || multiple || 2002–2020 || 02 Feb 2020 || 67 || align=left | Disc.: LINEAR || 
|- id="2002 TH21" bgcolor=#E9E9E9
| 0 ||  || MBA-M || 18.11 || 1.0 km || multiple || 2002–2021 || 07 Apr 2021 || 105 || align=left | Disc.: LINEAR || 
|- id="2002 TC22" bgcolor=#FA8072
| 3 ||  || MCA || 18.0 || data-sort-value="0.75" | 750 m || multiple || 2002–2016 || 28 Nov 2016 || 59 || align=left | Disc.: LINEARAlt.: 2009 SQ234 || 
|- id="2002 TR25" bgcolor=#d6d6d6
| 0 ||  || MBA-O || 16.31 || 3.0 km || multiple || 2002–2021 || 07 Apr 2021 || 177 || align=left | Disc.: LINEARAlt.: 2008 XD13 || 
|- id="2002 TG29" bgcolor=#E9E9E9
| 0 ||  || MBA-M || 16.69 || 1.4 km || multiple || 2002–2021 || 10 May 2021 || 163 || align=left | Disc.: LINEAR || 
|- id="2002 TK33" bgcolor=#E9E9E9
| 0 ||  || MBA-M || 17.0 || 2.2 km || multiple || 2002–2021 || 09 Jan 2021 || 97 || align=left | Disc.: LINEARAlt.: 2011 TR2 || 
|- id="2002 TZ33" bgcolor=#E9E9E9
| 0 ||  || MBA-M || 17.4 || 1.4 km || multiple || 2002–2021 || 17 Jan 2021 || 164 || align=left | Disc.: LINEAR || 
|- id="2002 TL35" bgcolor=#fefefe
| 0 ||  || MBA-I || 17.97 || data-sort-value="0.76" | 760 m || multiple || 1995–2022 || 27 Jan 2022 || 142 || align=left | Disc.: LINEAR || 
|- id="2002 TK36" bgcolor=#E9E9E9
| 3 ||  || MBA-M || 17.6 || data-sort-value="0.90" | 900 m || multiple || 2002–2020 || 25 Jan 2020 || 34 || align=left | Disc.: LINEARAlt.: 2006 UX63 || 
|- id="2002 TO37" bgcolor=#E9E9E9
| 0 ||  || MBA-M || 17.6 || 1.3 km || multiple || 2002–2020 || 17 Dec 2020 || 128 || align=left | Disc.: LINEAR || 
|- id="2002 TA49" bgcolor=#fefefe
| 0 ||  || MBA-I || 17.80 || data-sort-value="0.82" | 820 m || multiple || 2002–2021 || 08 Apr 2021 || 126 || align=left | Disc.: LINEAR || 
|- id="2002 TM50" bgcolor=#FA8072
| 1 ||  || MCA || 16.9 || 1.2 km || multiple || 2002–2019 || 22 Dec 2019 || 166 || align=left | Disc.: LINEAR || 
|- id="2002 TL55" bgcolor=#fefefe
| 0 ||  || MBA-I || 18.27 || data-sort-value="0.66" | 660 m || multiple || 2002–2021 || 01 May 2021 || 158 || align=left | Disc.: AMOSAlt.: 2012 TD138 || 
|- id="2002 TR55" bgcolor=#fefefe
| 1 ||  || MBA-I || 18.1 || data-sort-value="0.71" | 710 m || multiple || 2002–2021 || 07 Jan 2021 || 162 || align=left | Disc.: AMOSAlt.: 2009 PK14 || 
|- id="2002 TV55" bgcolor=#FFC2E0
| 3 ||  || APO || 21.0 || data-sort-value="0.22" | 220 m || single || 176 days || 09 Mar 2003 || 49 || align=left | Disc.: LINEARAMO at MPC || 
|- id="2002 TX55" bgcolor=#FFC2E0
| 1 ||  || APO || 23.7 || data-sort-value="0.065" | 65 m || multiple || 2002–2012 || 16 Nov 2012 || 85 || align=left | Disc.: LINEARAlt.: 2012 UA69 || 
|- id="2002 TG56" bgcolor=#fefefe
| 0 ||  || MBA-I || 18.1 || data-sort-value="0.71" | 710 m || multiple || 2002–2021 || 11 Jan 2021 || 118 || align=left | Disc.: KLENOT || 
|- id="2002 TZ57" bgcolor=#FFC2E0
| 8 ||  || APO || 24.6 || data-sort-value="0.043" | 43 m || single || 7 days || 10 Oct 2002 || 22 || align=left | Disc.: LINEAR || 
|- id="2002 TA58" bgcolor=#FFC2E0
| 5 ||  || APO || 26.8 || data-sort-value="0.016" | 16 m || single || 4 days || 07 Oct 2002 || 46 || align=left | Disc.: LINEAR || 
|- id="2002 TD58" bgcolor=#FFC2E0
| 4 ||  || AMO || 23.1 || data-sort-value="0.085" | 85 m || single || 29 days || 29 Oct 2002 || 37 || align=left | Disc.: NEAT || 
|- id="2002 TE58" bgcolor=#FA8072
| 5 ||  || MCA || 20.0 || data-sort-value="0.42" | 420 m || single || 80 days || 02 Nov 2002 || 51 || align=left | Disc.: NEAT || 
|- id="2002 TG58" bgcolor=#FA8072
| 1 ||  || MCA || 17.5 || 1.8 km || multiple || 2002–2012 || 21 Aug 2012 || 119 || align=left | Disc.: LINEAR || 
|- id="2002 TT58" bgcolor=#E9E9E9
| 0 ||  || MBA-M || 17.5 || 1.8 km || multiple || 2002–2020 || 11 Oct 2020 || 71 || align=left | Disc.: CINEOS || 
|- id="2002 TX58" bgcolor=#FA8072
| 1 ||  || MCA || 17.2 || 2.0 km || multiple || 2002–2019 || 08 Apr 2019 || 50 || align=left | Disc.: CINEOS || 
|- id="2002 TF59" bgcolor=#FA8072
| 3 ||  || MCA || 17.6 || 900 m || multiple || 2002-2022 || 26 May 2022 || 94 || align=left | Disc.: LINEAR || 
|- id="2002 TH59" bgcolor=#d6d6d6
| 0 ||  || MBA-O || 16.70 || 2.5 km || multiple || 2002–2021 || 15 Apr 2021 || 141 || align=left | Disc.: Pla D'Arguines Obs.Alt.: 2018 UG9 || 
|- id="2002 TX59" bgcolor=#FFC2E0
| 4 ||  || AMO || 23.9 || data-sort-value="0.059" | 59 m || multiple || 2002–2021 || 31 Oct 2021 || 20 || align=left | Disc.: LINEAR || 
|- id="2002 TY59" bgcolor=#FFC2E0
| 5 ||  || APO || 25.5 || data-sort-value="0.028" | 28 m || single || 26 days || 30 Oct 2002 || 80 || align=left | Disc.: LINEAR || 
|- id="2002 TZ59" bgcolor=#FFC2E0
| 9 ||  || APO || 23.1 || data-sort-value="0.085" | 85 m || single || 5 days || 08 Oct 2002 || 28 || align=left | Disc.: LINEAR || 
|- id="2002 TA60" bgcolor=#FFC2E0
| 5 ||  || APO || 20.7 || data-sort-value="0.26" | 260 m || multiple || 2002–2007 || 14 Oct 2007 || 53 || align=left | Disc.: LINEAR || 
|- id="2002 TB60" bgcolor=#FA8072
| – ||  || MCA || 21.3 || data-sort-value="0.16" | 160 m || single || 39 days || 13 Nov 2002 || 32 || align=left | Disc.: LPL/Spacewatch II || 
|- id="2002 TC60" bgcolor=#FFC2E0
| 1 ||  || AMO || 18.4 || data-sort-value="0.74" | 740 m || multiple || 2002–2018 || 08 Apr 2018 || 66 || align=left | Disc.: LINEAR || 
|- id="2002 TE60" bgcolor=#FA8072
| 1 ||  || MCA || 17.8 || data-sort-value="0.82" | 820 m || multiple || 2002–2019 || 18 Nov 2019 || 52 || align=left | Disc.: NEATAlt.: 2014 KA76 || 
|- id="2002 TZ60" bgcolor=#E9E9E9
| 0 ||  || MBA-M || 17.7 || 1.6 km || multiple || 2002–2021 || 05 Jan 2021 || 229 || align=left | Disc.: NEATAlt.: 2006 KH131 || 
|- id="2002 TH61" bgcolor=#d6d6d6
| 1 ||  || MBA-O || 17.0 || 2.2 km || multiple || 2002–2020 || 26 Jan 2020 || 73 || align=left | Disc.: CINEOS || 
|- id="2002 TM61" bgcolor=#E9E9E9
| 3 ||  || MBA-M || 17.5 || data-sort-value="0.94" | 940 m || multiple || 2002–2019 || 28 Dec 2019 || 42 || align=left | Disc.: CINEOS || 
|- id="2002 TO61" bgcolor=#d6d6d6
| 0 ||  || MBA-O || 16.4 || 2.9 km || multiple || 2002–2021 || 16 Jan 2021 || 133 || align=left | Disc.: CINEOSAlt.: 2013 QE31 || 
|- id="2002 TV61" bgcolor=#fefefe
| 0 ||  || HUN || 18.44 || data-sort-value="0.61" | 610 m || multiple || 2002–2021 || 03 Dec 2021 || 202 || align=left | Disc.: CINEOSAlt.: 2012 HX30 || 
|- id="2002 TQ62" bgcolor=#d6d6d6
| 3 ||  || MBA-O || 17.5 || 1.8 km || multiple || 2002–2018 || 18 Oct 2018 || 42 || align=left | Disc.: CINEOS || 
|- id="2002 TL63" bgcolor=#E9E9E9
| 0 ||  || MBA-M || 17.4 || 1.4 km || multiple || 2002–2019 || 10 Dec 2019 || 146 || align=left | Disc.: CINEOSAlt.: 2012 AO15 || 
|- id="2002 TF64" bgcolor=#fefefe
| 0 ||  || MBA-I || 18.50 || data-sort-value="0.59" | 590 m || multiple || 2002–2019 || 15 Nov 2019 || 53 || align=left | Disc.: LINEAR || 
|- id="2002 TT64" bgcolor=#E9E9E9
| 0 ||  || MBA-M || 17.5 || 1.3 km || multiple || 2002–2019 || 26 Nov 2019 || 125 || align=left | Disc.: LINEARAlt.: 2015 TM206 || 
|- id="2002 TV64" bgcolor=#fefefe
| 0 ||  || MBA-I || 18.0 || data-sort-value="0.75" | 750 m || multiple || 2002–2020 || 09 Aug 2020 || 77 || align=left | Disc.: LINEAR || 
|- id="2002 TY64" bgcolor=#E9E9E9
| 1 ||  || MBA-M || 17.6 || data-sort-value="0.90" | 900 m || multiple || 2002–2020 || 19 Jan 2020 || 35 || align=left | Disc.: NEAT || 
|- id="2002 TN65" bgcolor=#FA8072
| E ||  || MCA || 18.9 || data-sort-value="0.49" | 490 m || single || 2 days || 07 Oct 2002 || 24 || align=left | Disc.: NEAT || 
|- id="2002 TV65" bgcolor=#E9E9E9
| 1 ||  || MBA-M || 17.3 || 1.0 km || multiple || 2002–2018 || 05 Jul 2018 || 110 || align=left | Disc.: LINEARAlt.: 2006 QL116 || 
|- id="2002 TF66" bgcolor=#FA8072
| 2 ||  || MCA || 19.7 || data-sort-value="0.34" | 340 m || multiple || 2002–2020 || 24 Mar 2020 || 61 || align=left | Disc.: LINEAR || 
|- id="2002 TG66" bgcolor=#FFC2E0
| 6 ||  || APO || 23.9 || data-sort-value="0.059" | 59 m || single || 10 days || 15 Oct 2002 || 21 || align=left | Disc.: NEAT || 
|- id="2002 TZ66" bgcolor=#FFC2E0
| 3 ||  || ATE || 25.9 || data-sort-value="0.023" | 23 m || single || 23 days || 30 Oct 2002 || 48 || align=left | Disc.: LPL/Spacewatch II || 
|- id="2002 TA67" bgcolor=#FFC2E0
| 8 ||  || APO || 22.8 || data-sort-value="0.098" | 98 m || single || 7 days || 14 Oct 2002 || 43 || align=left | Disc.: LPL/Spacewatch II || 
|- id="2002 TR67" bgcolor=#FFC2E0
| 6 ||  || AMO || 22.7 || data-sort-value="0.10" | 100 m || single || 40 days || 29 Oct 2002 || 25 || align=left | Disc.: NEAT || 
|- id="2002 TS67" bgcolor=#FFC2E0
| 0 ||  || AMO || 19.14 || data-sort-value="0.53" | 530 m || multiple || 2002–2021 || 21 Jan 2021 || 407 || align=left | Disc.: NEAT || 
|- id="2002 TZ67" bgcolor=#FA8072
| 2 ||  || MCA || 17.8 || 1.2 km || multiple || 2002–2019 || 28 Dec 2019 || 104 || align=left | Disc.: LINEAR || 
|- id="2002 TH68" bgcolor=#FFC2E0
| 4 ||  || AMO || 21.5 || data-sort-value="0.18" | 180 m || single || 34 days || 07 Nov 2002 || 77 || align=left | Disc.: LINEAR || 
|- id="2002 TT68" bgcolor=#FA8072
| – ||  || MCA || 19.7 || data-sort-value="0.34" | 340 m || single || 35 days || 13 Nov 2002 || 11 || align=left | Disc.: LPL/Spacewatch II || 
|- id="2002 TU68" bgcolor=#FA8072
| 0 ||  || MCA || 19.08 || data-sort-value="0.45" | 450 m || multiple || 2002–2021 || 17 May 2021 || 61 || align=left | Disc.: NEATAlt.: 2004 SS9 || 
|- id="2002 TW68" bgcolor=#FA8072
| 1 ||  || MCA || 18.1 || data-sort-value="0.71" | 710 m || multiple || 2002–2019 || 02 Apr 2019 || 100 || align=left | Disc.: LINEAR || 
|- id="2002 TY68" bgcolor=#FFC2E0
| 0 ||  || AMO || 18.7 || data-sort-value="0.65" | 650 m || multiple || 2002–2020 || 21 Apr 2020 || 206 || align=left | Disc.: NEAT || 
|- id="2002 TZ68" bgcolor=#FFC2E0
| 7 ||  || AMO || 26.4 || data-sort-value="0.019" | 19 m || single || 4 days || 13 Oct 2002 || 13 || align=left | Disc.: LINEAR || 
|- id="2002 TA69" bgcolor=#FFC2E0
| 1 ||  || APO || 18.2 || data-sort-value="0.81" | 810 m || multiple || 2002–2020 || 16 May 2020 || 90 || align=left | Disc.: LINEARNEO larger than 1 kilometer || 
|- id="2002 TB69" bgcolor=#FFC2E0
| 1 ||  || AMO || 18.9 || data-sort-value="0.59" | 590 m || multiple || 2002–2005 || 22 Nov 2005 || 71 || align=left | Disc.: LINEAR || 
|- id="2002 TH69" bgcolor=#FA8072
| 1 ||  || MCA || 17.5 || 1.3 km || multiple || 2002–2020 || 11 Apr 2020 || 112 || align=left | Disc.: LINEARAlt.: 2016 BO39 || 
|- id="2002 TP69" bgcolor=#FFC2E0
| 0 ||  || AMO || 21.93 || data-sort-value="0.15" | 150 m || multiple || 2002–2022 || 27 Jan 2022 || 436 || align=left | Disc.: LONEOS || 
|- id="2002 TQ69" bgcolor=#FA8072
| 0 ||  || MCA || 21.27 || data-sort-value="0.17" | 170 m || multiple || 2002–2016 || 19 Oct 2016 || 59 || align=left | Disc.: NEAT || 
|- id="2002 TS69" bgcolor=#FFC2E0
| 1 ||  || AMO || 24.4 || data-sort-value="0.047" | 47 m || multiple || 2002–2016 || 24 Aug 2016 || 55 || align=left | Disc.: LINEAR || 
|- id="2002 TB70" bgcolor=#FFC2E0
| 2 ||  || APO || 21.6 || data-sort-value="0.17" | 170 m || multiple || 2002–2020 || 06 Oct 2020 || 63 || align=left | Disc.: NEATPotentially hazardous object || 
|- id="2002 TW71" bgcolor=#fefefe
| 0 ||  || MBA-I || 18.09 || data-sort-value="0.72" | 720 m || multiple || 2002–2021 || 12 May 2021 || 147 || align=left | Disc.: NEAT || 
|- id="2002 TM73" bgcolor=#E9E9E9
| 0 ||  || MBA-M || 17.42 || 1.4 km || multiple || 2002–2021 || 18 Apr 2021 || 322 || align=left | Disc.: NEAT || 
|- id="2002 TO75" bgcolor=#E9E9E9
| 1 ||  || MBA-M || 17.6 || data-sort-value="0.90" | 900 m || multiple || 2002–2016 || 13 Jan 2016 || 74 || align=left | Disc.: LONEOSAlt.: 2006 PW8 || 
|- id="2002 TR75" bgcolor=#fefefe
| 0 ||  || MBA-I || 18.5 || data-sort-value="0.59" | 590 m || multiple || 2002–2020 || 21 Jan 2020 || 137 || align=left | Disc.: LONEOS || 
|- id="2002 TK78" bgcolor=#FA8072
| 0 ||  || MCA || 18.98 || data-sort-value="0.48" | 480 m || multiple || 2002–2022 || 27 Jan 2022 || 75 || align=left | Disc.: LONEOSAlt.: 2005 QK97 || 
|- id="2002 TL80" bgcolor=#d6d6d6
| 0 ||  || MBA-O || 16.05 || 3.4 km || multiple || 2002–2021 || 04 May 2021 || 214 || align=left | Disc.: LONEOSAlt.: 2013 TZ3 || 
|- id="2002 TN80" bgcolor=#FA8072
| – ||  || MCA || 19.2 || data-sort-value="0.43" | 430 m || single || 32 days || 30 Oct 2002 || 31 || align=left | Disc.: LONEOS || 
|- id="2002 TS80" bgcolor=#FA8072
| 1 ||  || MCA || 18.0 || 1.1 km || multiple || 2002–2019 || 15 Nov 2019 || 109 || align=left | Disc.: LONEOSAlt.: 2010 JG164 || 
|- id="2002 TT81" bgcolor=#E9E9E9
| 0 ||  || MBA-M || 16.5 || 2.1 km || multiple || 2002–2021 || 07 Jan 2021 || 212 || align=left | Disc.: AMOSAlt.: 2011 UQ183 || 
|- id="2002 TZ81" bgcolor=#E9E9E9
| 0 ||  || MBA-M || 16.7 || 1.9 km || multiple || 2002–2021 || 23 Jan 2021 || 233 || align=left | Disc.: AMOS || 
|- id="2002 TB82" bgcolor=#d6d6d6
| 0 ||  || MBA-O || 15.7 || 4.2 km || multiple || 2002–2021 || 07 Jun 2021 || 159 || align=left | Disc.: AMOSAlt.: 2010 KB55 || 
|- id="2002 TX86" bgcolor=#E9E9E9
| 0 ||  || MBA-M || 17.7 || 1.2 km || multiple || 2002–2020 || 24 Dec 2020 || 104 || align=left | Disc.: LINEAR || 
|- id="2002 TF87" bgcolor=#fefefe
| 0 ||  || MBA-I || 18.24 || data-sort-value="0.67" | 670 m || multiple || 2002–2021 || 10 Oct 2021 || 148 || align=left | Disc.: LINEAR || 
|- id="2002 TG87" bgcolor=#E9E9E9
| 0 ||  || MBA-M || 17.5 || 1.3 km || multiple || 2002–2021 || 04 Jan 2021 || 215 || align=left | Disc.: LINEARAlt.: 2011 WO21 || 
|- id="2002 TQ87" bgcolor=#E9E9E9
| 2 ||  || MBA-M || 18.1 || data-sort-value="0.71" | 710 m || multiple || 2002–2014 || 31 May 2014 || 39 || align=left | Disc.: LINEARAlt.: 2006 RM60 || 
|- id="2002 TS88" bgcolor=#fefefe
| 0 ||  || MBA-I || 17.5 || data-sort-value="0.94" | 940 m || multiple || 2002–2021 || 05 Jan 2021 || 255 || align=left | Disc.: NEATAlt.: 2002 TT302, 2009 OY13 || 
|- id="2002 TA89" bgcolor=#fefefe
| 0 ||  || MBA-I || 18.1 || data-sort-value="0.71" | 710 m || multiple || 2002–2020 || 12 Dec 2020 || 56 || align=left | Disc.: NEAT || 
|- id="2002 TC90" bgcolor=#fefefe
| 0 ||  || HUN || 18.37 || data-sort-value="0.63" | 630 m || multiple || 2002–2021 || 24 Oct 2021 || 110 || align=left | Disc.: NEAT || 
|- id="2002 TD92" bgcolor=#E9E9E9
| 1 ||  || MBA-M || 17.4 || 1.8 km || multiple || 2002–2020 || 15 Dec 2020 || 144 || align=left | Disc.: LINEARAlt.: 2011 SP117 || 
|- id="2002 TM92" bgcolor=#d6d6d6
| 0 ||  || MBA-O || 15.57 || 4.3 km || multiple || 2002–2022 || 20 Jan 2022 || 276 || align=left | Disc.: LINEARAlt.: 2010 CJ246, 2013 JK26 || 
|- id="2002 TN92" bgcolor=#d6d6d6
| 0 ||  || MBA-O || 15.8 || 3.9 km || multiple || 2002–2021 || 03 Jan 2021 || 195 || align=left | Disc.: LINEAR || 
|- id="2002 TA93" bgcolor=#E9E9E9
| 0 ||  || MBA-M || 16.9 || 1.8 km || multiple || 2002–2021 || 16 Jan 2021 || 228 || align=left | Disc.: LINEAR || 
|- id="2002 TN93" bgcolor=#d6d6d6
| 0 ||  || MBA-O || 15.9 || 3.7 km || multiple || 2000–2020 || 23 Dec 2020 || 178 || align=left | Disc.: LINEARAlt.: 2016 EU153 || 
|- id="2002 TO94" bgcolor=#fefefe
| 2 ||  || MBA-I || 19.0 || data-sort-value="0.47" | 470 m || multiple || 2002–2019 || 29 Oct 2019 || 48 || align=left | Disc.: LINEAR || 
|- id="2002 TF95" bgcolor=#E9E9E9
| 0 ||  || MBA-M || 17.5 || 1.3 km || multiple || 2002–2021 || 21 Jan 2021 || 110 || align=left | Disc.: LINEAR || 
|- id="2002 TZ95" bgcolor=#d6d6d6
| 0 ||  || MBA-O || 16.2 || 3.2 km || multiple || 2001–2019 || 22 Dec 2019 || 213 || align=left | Disc.: NEAT || 
|- id="2002 TW96" bgcolor=#fefefe
| 0 ||  || MBA-I || 18.48 || data-sort-value="0.60" | 600 m || multiple || 2001–2021 || 02 May 2021 || 127 || align=left | Disc.: Kitt Peak Obs.Alt.: 2001 FN202 || 
|- id="2002 TT97" bgcolor=#d6d6d6
| 0 ||  || MBA-O || 15.95 || 3.6 km || multiple || 1997–2021 || 12 May 2021 || 267 || align=left | Disc.: CINEOSAlt.: 2008 YH11 || 
|- id="2002 TC98" bgcolor=#d6d6d6
| 0 ||  || MBA-O || 17.75 || 1.6 km || multiple || 2002–2021 || 03 Aug 2021 || 89 || align=left | Disc.: LINEARAlt.: 2007 TC61 || 
|- id="2002 TQ98" bgcolor=#E9E9E9
| 0 ||  || MBA-M || 17.52 || data-sort-value="0.93" | 930 m || multiple || 2002–2021 || 15 Apr 2021 || 170 || align=left | Disc.: LINEARAlt.: 2006 RV19, 2010 RC2 || 
|- id="2002 TA99" bgcolor=#fefefe
| 0 ||  || MBA-I || 18.4 || data-sort-value="0.62" | 620 m || multiple || 2002–2020 || 22 Mar 2020 || 124 || align=left | Disc.: LINEAR || 
|- id="2002 TB99" bgcolor=#fefefe
| 0 ||  || MBA-I || 18.61 || data-sort-value="0.56" | 560 m || multiple || 2002–2022 || 06 Jan 2022 || 74 || align=left | Disc.: LINEARAlt.: 2013 PY67 || 
|- id="2002 TK99" bgcolor=#fefefe
| 0 ||  || MBA-I || 18.71 || data-sort-value="0.54" | 540 m || multiple || 2002–2021 || 28 Nov 2021 || 56 || align=left | Disc.: NEAT || 
|- id="2002 TZ99" bgcolor=#d6d6d6
| 0 ||  || MBA-O || 16.91 || 2.3 km || multiple || 2002–2021 || 09 May 2021 || 174 || align=left | Disc.: LONEOS || 
|- id="2002 TD100" bgcolor=#E9E9E9
| 0 ||  || MBA-M || 16.9 || 1.8 km || multiple || 2002–2021 || 16 Jan 2021 || 148 || align=left | Disc.: NEATAlt.: 2015 RM30 || 
|- id="2002 TP100" bgcolor=#E9E9E9
| 2 ||  || MBA-M || 18.2 || data-sort-value="0.96" | 960 m || multiple || 2002–2019 || 30 Nov 2019 || 79 || align=left | Disc.: LINEAR || 
|- id="2002 TC101" bgcolor=#fefefe
| 0 ||  || MBA-I || 17.54 || data-sort-value="0.92" | 920 m || multiple || 2002–2021 || 11 May 2021 || 271 || align=left | Disc.: LINEAR || 
|- id="2002 TW101" bgcolor=#E9E9E9
| 0 ||  || MBA-M || 17.0 || 1.7 km || multiple || 2002–2021 || 21 Jan 2021 || 222 || align=left | Disc.: LINEAR || 
|- id="2002 TL102" bgcolor=#E9E9E9
| 0 ||  || MBA-M || 17.5 || data-sort-value="0.94" | 940 m || multiple || 2002–2020 || 21 Apr 2020 || 158 || align=left | Disc.: LINEARAlt.: 2014 OQ231 || 
|- id="2002 TV103" bgcolor=#d6d6d6
| 0 ||  || MBA-O || 17.17 || 2.0 km || multiple || 2002–2021 || 07 Apr 2021 || 89 || align=left | Disc.: LINEAR || 
|- id="2002 TW103" bgcolor=#E9E9E9
| 0 ||  || MBA-M || 17.82 || data-sort-value="0.81" | 810 m || multiple || 2002–2021 || 15 Apr 2021 || 72 || align=left | Disc.: LINEARAlt.: 2010 KC16 || 
|- id="2002 TX103" bgcolor=#d6d6d6
| 0 ||  || MBA-O || 16.86 || 2.4 km || multiple || 2002–2021 || 17 Apr 2021 || 64 || align=left | Disc.: LINEAR || 
|- id="2002 TC104" bgcolor=#fefefe
| 0 ||  || MBA-I || 17.83 || data-sort-value="0.81" | 810 m || multiple || 2002–2021 || 09 Apr 2021 || 113 || align=left | Disc.: LINEAR || 
|- id="2002 TE104" bgcolor=#d6d6d6
| 0 ||  || MBA-O || 15.5 || 4.4 km || multiple || 2002–2021 || 18 Jan 2021 || 300 || align=left | Disc.: LINEARAlt.: 2008 UC312 || 
|- id="2002 TN104" bgcolor=#E9E9E9
| 0 ||  || MBA-M || 17.3 || 1.5 km || multiple || 2002–2019 || 04 Oct 2019 || 122 || align=left | Disc.: LINEAR || 
|- id="2002 TV104" bgcolor=#E9E9E9
| 2 ||  || MBA-M || 18.7 || data-sort-value="0.76" | 760 m || multiple || 2002–2015 || 10 Oct 2015 || 38 || align=left | Disc.: LINEARAlt.: 2015 PA248 || 
|- id="2002 TE106" bgcolor=#E9E9E9
| 2 ||  || MBA-M || 18.5 || data-sort-value="0.84" | 840 m || multiple || 2002–2019 || 06 Sep 2019 || 47 || align=left | Disc.: LPL/Spacewatch II || 
|- id="2002 TF106" bgcolor=#d6d6d6
| 0 ||  || MBA-O || 17.0 || 2.2 km || multiple || 2002–2019 || 17 Dec 2019 || 96 || align=left | Disc.: LPL/Spacewatch II || 
|- id="2002 TJ106" bgcolor=#d6d6d6
| 0 ||  || MBA-O || 16.17 || 3.2 km || multiple || 2002–2021 || 13 May 2021 || 185 || align=left | Disc.: NEAT || 
|- id="2002 TK106" bgcolor=#E9E9E9
| 1 ||  || MBA-M || 17.6 || 1.7 km || multiple || 1993–2020 || 16 Nov 2020 || 94 || align=left | Disc.: NEATAlt.: 2011 SJ320 || 
|- id="2002 TO106" bgcolor=#d6d6d6
| 0 ||  || MBA-O || 16.7 || 2.5 km || multiple || 2002–2020 || 03 Jan 2020 || 33 || align=left | Disc.: NEAT || 
|- id="2002 TP106" bgcolor=#d6d6d6
| 0 ||  || MBA-O || 17.0 || 2.2 km || multiple || 2002–2018 || 10 Nov 2018 || 84 || align=left | Disc.: NEAT || 
|- id="2002 TX106" bgcolor=#E9E9E9
| 0 ||  || MBA-M || 18.2 || data-sort-value="0.96" | 960 m || multiple || 2002–2019 || 04 Nov 2019 || 54 || align=left | Disc.: LINEAR || 
|- id="2002 TZ106" bgcolor=#d6d6d6
| – ||  || MBA-O || 18.2 || 1.3 km || single || 22 days || 06 Oct 2002 || 15 || align=left | Disc.: LINEAR || 
|- id="2002 TE112" bgcolor=#fefefe
| 0 ||  || HUN || 17.7 || data-sort-value="0.86" | 860 m || multiple || 2002–2020 || 19 Apr 2020 || 279 || align=left | Disc.: LINEAR || 
|- id="2002 TS112" bgcolor=#d6d6d6
| 0 ||  || MBA-O || 17.1 || 2.1 km || multiple || 2002–2019 || 02 Nov 2019 || 120 || align=left | Disc.: LINEARAlt.: 2013 QA1 || 
|- id="2002 TT112" bgcolor=#d6d6d6
| 0 ||  || MBA-O || 16.52 || 2.8 km || multiple || 2002–2021 || 10 May 2021 || 93 || align=left | Disc.: LINEARAlt.: 2015 DP196 || 
|- id="2002 TD114" bgcolor=#d6d6d6
| 0 ||  || MBA-O || 17.2 || 2.0 km || multiple || 2002–2021 || 15 Jan 2021 || 101 || align=left | Disc.: NEAT || 
|- id="2002 TO114" bgcolor=#d6d6d6
| 0 ||  || MBA-O || 16.09 || 3.4 km || multiple || 1999–2021 || 14 Apr 2021 || 150 || align=left | Disc.: NEATAlt.: 2010 JR55, 2016 EN52 || 
|- id="2002 TX114" bgcolor=#d6d6d6
| 0 ||  || MBA-O || 16.51 || 2.8 km || multiple || 2002–2021 || 05 Nov 2021 || 159 || align=left | Disc.: NEATAdded on 21 August 2021Alt.: 2021 MS2 || 
|- id="2002 TQ115" bgcolor=#d6d6d6
| 0 ||  || MBA-O || 15.88 || 3.7 km || multiple || 2002–2021 || 08 May 2021 || 155 || align=left | Disc.: NEATAlt.: 2012 QE15 || 
|- id="2002 TV115" bgcolor=#fefefe
| 0 ||  || MBA-I || 17.8 || data-sort-value="0.82" | 820 m || multiple || 2002–2020 || 17 Feb 2020 || 121 || align=left | Disc.: NEAT || 
|- id="2002 TO116" bgcolor=#d6d6d6
| 0 ||  || MBA-O || 16.0 || 3.5 km || multiple || 2002–2021 || 08 Jun 2021 || 153 || align=left | Disc.: NEATAlt.: 2008 YD4 || 
|- id="2002 TO117" bgcolor=#d6d6d6
| 0 ||  || MBA-O || 16.45 || 2.9 km || multiple || 2002–2021 || 03 May 2021 || 119 || align=left | Disc.: NEAT || 
|- id="2002 TF118" bgcolor=#fefefe
| 0 ||  || MBA-I || 17.4 || data-sort-value="0.98" | 980 m || multiple || 1998–2020 || 15 Dec 2020 || 249 || align=left | Disc.: NEATAlt.: 2009 SP49, 2011 CA81 || 
|- id="2002 TL118" bgcolor=#FA8072
| 3 ||  || MCA || 18.8 || data-sort-value="0.73" | 730 m || multiple || 2002–2015 || 03 Dec 2015 || 42 || align=left | Disc.: NEATAlt.: 2015 TW207 || 
|- id="2002 TZ118" bgcolor=#E9E9E9
| 0 ||  || MBA-M || 17.11 || 1.1 km || multiple || 2002–2021 || 09 May 2021 || 112 || align=left | Disc.: NEATAlt.: 2014 ST221 || 
|- id="2002 TU119" bgcolor=#d6d6d6
| 0 ||  || MBA-O || 15.97 || 3.6 km || multiple || 2002–2021 || 12 May 2021 || 180 || align=left | Disc.: NEATAlt.: 2013 VH17 || 
|- id="2002 TC120" bgcolor=#E9E9E9
| 0 ||  || MBA-M || 18.4 || data-sort-value="0.62" | 620 m || multiple || 2002–2020 || 02 Feb 2020 || 61 || align=left | Disc.: NEATAlt.: 2014 OF25 || 
|- id="2002 TL123" bgcolor=#E9E9E9
| 0 ||  || MBA-M || 16.7 || 1.9 km || multiple || 1998–2021 || 14 Jan 2021 || 256 || align=left | Disc.: NEAT || 
|- id="2002 TZ123" bgcolor=#d6d6d6
| 0 ||  || MBA-O || 16.04 || 3.4 km || multiple || 1997–2021 || 08 May 2021 || 251 || align=left | Disc.: NEAT || 
|- id="2002 TH125" bgcolor=#fefefe
| 1 ||  || MBA-I || 18.5 || data-sort-value="0.59" | 590 m || multiple || 2002–2020 || 24 Jan 2020 || 61 || align=left | Disc.: NEAT || 
|- id="2002 TP125" bgcolor=#d6d6d6
| 0 ||  || MBA-O || 15.9 || 3.7 km || multiple || 2002–2021 || 18 Jan 2021 || 181 || align=left | Disc.: NEATAlt.: 2017 KK21 || 
|- id="2002 TB126" bgcolor=#d6d6d6
| 2 ||  || MBA-O || 17.4 || 1.8 km || multiple || 2002–2019 || 28 Dec 2019 || 60 || align=left | Disc.: NEATAlt.: 2015 BJ284 || 
|- id="2002 TT126" bgcolor=#fefefe
| 0 ||  || MBA-I || 17.6 || data-sort-value="0.90" | 900 m || multiple || 2002–2020 || 26 Nov 2020 || 178 || align=left | Disc.: LINEAR || 
|- id="2002 TH127" bgcolor=#fefefe
| 0 ||  || MBA-I || 18.3 || data-sort-value="0.65" | 650 m || multiple || 2002–2020 || 15 Feb 2020 || 101 || align=left | Disc.: NEATAlt.: 2015 RZ16 || 
|- id="2002 TF128" bgcolor=#E9E9E9
| 3 ||  || MBA-M || 17.9 || 1.5 km || multiple || 2002–2020 || 17 Dec 2020 || 105 || align=left | Disc.: NEAT || 
|- id="2002 TA129" bgcolor=#FA8072
| 1 ||  || MCA || 18.99 || data-sort-value="0.47" | 470 m || multiple || 2002–2021 || 07 Feb 2021 || 34 || align=left | Disc.: NEAT || 
|- id="2002 TV129" bgcolor=#E9E9E9
| 1 ||  || MBA-M || 17.1 || 1.6 km || multiple || 2002–2016 || 30 Jan 2016 || 173 || align=left | Disc.: NEAT || 
|- id="2002 TX129" bgcolor=#d6d6d6
| 0 ||  || MBA-O || 15.74 || 4.0 km || multiple || 1997–2021 || 09 May 2021 || 270 || align=left | Disc.: NEATAlt.: 2013 VZ7 || 
|- id="2002 TZ129" bgcolor=#E9E9E9
| 1 ||  || MBA-M || 18.1 || 980 m || multiple || 2002-2020 || 21 Mar 2020 || 41 || align=left | Disc.: NEATAlt.: 2020 BG14 || 
|- id="2002 TE130" bgcolor=#E9E9E9
| 0 ||  || MBA-M || 16.70 || 2.5 km || multiple || 2002–2021 || 02 Dec 2021 || 170 || align=left | Disc.: LINEARAlt.: 2009 BJ180 || 
|- id="2002 TU130" bgcolor=#E9E9E9
| 0 ||  || MBA-M || 17.2 || 1.1 km || multiple || 2002–2019 || 24 Dec 2019 || 103 || align=left | Disc.: LINEAR || 
|- id="2002 TO131" bgcolor=#E9E9E9
| 0 ||  || MBA-M || 17.5 || 1.3 km || multiple || 2002–2019 || 26 Oct 2019 || 108 || align=left | Disc.: LINEAR || 
|- id="2002 TM132" bgcolor=#fefefe
| 1 ||  || MBA-I || 17.9 || data-sort-value="0.78" | 780 m || multiple || 2002–2021 || 16 Jan 2021 || 134 || align=left | Disc.: LINEAR || 
|- id="2002 TS132" bgcolor=#E9E9E9
| 0 ||  || MBA-M || 16.9 || 1.8 km || multiple || 2002–2021 || 16 Jan 2021 || 219 || align=left | Disc.: LINEAR || 
|- id="2002 TY133" bgcolor=#d6d6d6
| 0 ||  || MBA-O || 16.43 || 2.9 km || multiple || 2002–2021 || 09 Apr 2021 || 189 || align=left | Disc.: NEAT || 
|- id="2002 TZ134" bgcolor=#E9E9E9
| 0 ||  || MBA-M || 17.3 || 1.9 km || multiple || 2002–2017 || 23 Jan 2017 || 79 || align=left | Disc.: NEATAlt.: 2011 QY4 || 
|- id="2002 TY135" bgcolor=#E9E9E9
| 0 ||  || MBA-M || 16.55 || 2.7 km || multiple || 2002–2021 || 03 Dec 2021 || 281 || align=left | Disc.: LONEOS || 
|- id="2002 TJ137" bgcolor=#d6d6d6
| 0 ||  || MBA-O || 15.78 || 3.9 km || multiple || 2002–2021 || 08 Apr 2021 || 238 || align=left | Disc.: LONEOSAlt.: 2013 QN44 || 
|- id="2002 TA140" bgcolor=#FA8072
| 2 ||  || MCA || 18.6 || data-sort-value="0.57" | 570 m || multiple || 2002–2019 || 20 Dec 2019 || 27 || align=left | Disc.: LINEAR || 
|- id="2002 TC140" bgcolor=#d6d6d6
| 0 ||  || MBA-O || 15.9 || 3.7 km || multiple || 2002–2021 || 12 Jan 2021 || 140 || align=left | Disc.: LINEAR || 
|- id="2002 TK140" bgcolor=#E9E9E9
| 2 ||  || MBA-M || 18.4 || data-sort-value="0.62" | 620 m || multiple || 2002–2014 || 20 Sep 2014 || 56 || align=left | Disc.: NEATAlt.: 2014 OA242 || 
|- id="2002 TL140" bgcolor=#d6d6d6
| 0 ||  || MBA-O || 16.4 || 2.9 km || multiple || 1991–2021 || 14 Jan 2021 || 143 || align=left | Disc.: NEATAlt.: 2008 VX33 || 
|- id="2002 TM140" bgcolor=#d6d6d6
| 0 ||  || MBA-O || 16.4 || 2.9 km || multiple || 2002–2021 || 12 Jun 2021 || 171 || align=left | Disc.: NEATAlt.: 2005 EZ179 || 
|- id="2002 TN140" bgcolor=#fefefe
| 3 ||  || MBA-I || 18.6 || data-sort-value="0.57" | 570 m || multiple || 2002–2020 || 17 Dec 2020 || 48 || align=left | Disc.: NEATAdded on 9 March 2021Alt.: 2020 TL22 || 
|- id="2002 TQ140" bgcolor=#fefefe
| 0 ||  || MBA-I || 18.80 || data-sort-value="0.52" | 520 m || multiple || 2002–2021 || 07 Apr 2021 || 42 || align=left | Disc.: NEAT || 
|- id="2002 TD141" bgcolor=#d6d6d6
| 0 ||  || MBA-O || 17.48 || 1.8 km || multiple || 2002–2021 || 24 Nov 2021 || 71 || align=left | Disc.: LPL/Spacewatch IIAdded on 22 July 2020 || 
|- id="2002 TK141" bgcolor=#E9E9E9
| 0 ||  || MBA-M || 16.9 || 2.3 km || multiple || 2002–2020 || 06 Dec 2020 || 216 || align=left | Disc.: LPL/Spacewatch II || 
|- id="2002 TN141" bgcolor=#fefefe
| 0 ||  || MBA-I || 17.8 || data-sort-value="0.82" | 820 m || multiple || 2002–2021 || 05 Jan 2021 || 85 || align=left | Disc.: LINEARAlt.: 2012 GG26 || 
|- id="2002 TR141" bgcolor=#d6d6d6
| 2 ||  || MBA-O || 18.0 || 1.4 km || multiple || 2002–2018 || 03 Oct 2018 || 31 || align=left | Disc.: NEATAlt.: 2018 PF38 || 
|- id="2002 TT141" bgcolor=#E9E9E9
| – ||  || MBA-M || 18.2 || data-sort-value="0.68" | 680 m || single || 22 days || 06 Oct 2002 || 10 || align=left | Disc.: NEAT || 
|- id="2002 TV141" bgcolor=#E9E9E9
| 0 ||  || MBA-M || 17.8 || data-sort-value="0.82" | 820 m || multiple || 2002–2020 || 01 Feb 2020 || 83 || align=left | Disc.: NEATAlt.: 2006 SW135 || 
|- id="2002 TX141" bgcolor=#E9E9E9
| 0 ||  || MBA-M || 18.23 || data-sort-value="0.75" | 750 m || multiple || 2002–2018 || 06 Jul 2022 || 96 || align=left | Disc.: NEATAlt.: 2014 OL307 || 
|- id="2002 TY141" bgcolor=#E9E9E9
| 0 ||  || MBA-M || 17.42 || 1.4 km || multiple || 2002–2021 || 09 Apr 2021 || 162 || align=left | Disc.: NEATAlt.: 2015 XD70 || 
|- id="2002 TC142" bgcolor=#fefefe
| 0 ||  || MBA-I || 17.17 || 1.1 km || multiple || 2002–2021 || 05 Dec 2021 || 208 || align=left | Disc.: NEATAlt.: 2013 PJ3 || 
|- id="2002 TF142" bgcolor=#d6d6d6
| 0 ||  || MBA-O || 15.9 || 3.7 km || multiple || 2002–2021 || 14 Jan 2021 || 158 || align=left | Disc.: LINEARAlt.: 2013 QS80 || 
|- id="2002 TG144" bgcolor=#E9E9E9
| 0 ||  || MBA-M || 17.66 || 1.2 km || multiple || 2002–2021 || 18 Jan 2021 || 156 || align=left | Disc.: LINEAR || 
|- id="2002 TC145" bgcolor=#d6d6d6
| 0 ||  || MBA-O || 16.37 || 3.0 km || multiple || 1991–2021 || 09 Apr 2021 || 149 || align=left | Disc.: CINEOS || 
|- id="2002 TD145" bgcolor=#E9E9E9
| 1 ||  || MBA-M || 17.7 || 1.2 km || multiple || 2002–2020 || 14 Dec 2020 || 93 || align=left | Disc.: NEATAlt.: 2011 WF78 || 
|- id="2002 TN145" bgcolor=#fefefe
| 1 ||  || MBA-I || 18.5 || data-sort-value="0.59" | 590 m || multiple || 2002–2019 || 17 Dec 2019 || 54 || align=left | Disc.: LINEAR || 
|- id="2002 TR145" bgcolor=#d6d6d6
| 0 ||  || MBA-O || 16.4 || 2.9 km || multiple || 2002–2021 || 18 Jan 2021 || 109 || align=left | Disc.: CINEOS || 
|- id="2002 TT145" bgcolor=#d6d6d6
| 0 ||  || MBA-O || 16.20 || 3.2 km || multiple || 2002–2021 || 08 Apr 2021 || 202 || align=left | Disc.: CINEOSAlt.: 2005 EJ103 || 
|- id="2002 TZ146" bgcolor=#E9E9E9
| 0 ||  || MBA-M || 18.01 || data-sort-value="0.74" | 740 m || multiple || 2002–2021 || 13 Apr 2021 || 66 || align=left | Disc.: LINEAR || 
|- id="2002 TM147" bgcolor=#fefefe
| 0 ||  || MBA-I || 18.0 || data-sort-value="0.75" | 750 m || multiple || 2002–2019 || 31 Dec 2019 || 69 || align=left | Disc.: NEATAlt.: 2009 VJ98 || 
|- id="2002 TP147" bgcolor=#E9E9E9
| 0 ||  || MBA-M || 17.8 || 1.2 km || multiple || 1998–2019 || 28 Nov 2019 || 68 || align=left | Disc.: LPL/Spacewatch II || 
|- id="2002 TA148" bgcolor=#E9E9E9
| 0 ||  || MBA-M || 17.53 || data-sort-value="0.93" | 930 m || multiple || 1998–2021 || 14 Apr 2021 || 57 || align=left | Disc.: NEAT || 
|- id="2002 TJ148" bgcolor=#fefefe
| 0 ||  || MBA-I || 18.2 || data-sort-value="0.68" | 680 m || multiple || 2002–2019 || 20 Dec 2019 || 135 || align=left | Disc.: NEAT || 
|- id="2002 TQ148" bgcolor=#E9E9E9
| 0 ||  || MBA-M || 17.1 || 1.1 km || multiple || 2002–2020 || 05 Jan 2020 || 52 || align=left | Disc.: NEAT || 
|- id="2002 TG149" bgcolor=#E9E9E9
| 0 ||  || MBA-M || 16.7 || 1.9 km || multiple || 2002–2019 || 02 Oct 2019 || 204 || align=left | Disc.: NEAT || 
|- id="2002 TM149" bgcolor=#E9E9E9
| 0 ||  || MBA-M || 16.69 || 1.4 km || multiple || 2002–2021 || 07 Jun 2021 || 266 || align=left | Disc.: NEATAlt.: 2013 GO109, 2014 QD267 || 
|- id="2002 TB150" bgcolor=#fefefe
| 1 ||  || MBA-I || 18.7 || data-sort-value="0.54" | 540 m || multiple || 2002–2019 || 31 Dec 2019 || 66 || align=left | Disc.: NEAT || 
|- id="2002 TC150" bgcolor=#d6d6d6
| 0 ||  || MBA-O || 17.2 || 2.0 km || multiple || 2002–2021 || 10 Apr 2021 || 34 || align=left | Disc.: NEATAdded on 21 August 2021 || 
|- id="2002 TF150" bgcolor=#E9E9E9
| 5 ||  || MBA-M || 18.6 || data-sort-value="0.80" | 800 m || multiple || 2002–2014 || 24 Apr 2014 || 18 || align=left | Disc.: NEAT || 
|- id="2002 TJ150" bgcolor=#d6d6d6
| 0 ||  || MBA-O || 16.7 || 2.5 km || multiple || 2002–2021 || 15 Jan 2021 || 63 || align=left | Disc.: NEAT || 
|- id="2002 TL150" bgcolor=#fefefe
| 0 ||  || MBA-I || 19.4 || data-sort-value="0.39" | 390 m || multiple || 2002–2021 || 04 Jan 2021 || 31 || align=left | Disc.: NEAT || 
|- id="2002 TQ150" bgcolor=#fefefe
| 1 ||  || MBA-I || 18.9 || data-sort-value="0.49" | 490 m || multiple || 2002–2020 || 22 Jan 2020 || 46 || align=left | Disc.: NEAT || 
|- id="2002 TT150" bgcolor=#d6d6d6
| 4 ||  || MBA-O || 17.8 || 1.5 km || multiple || 2002–2018 || 05 Oct 2018 || 23 || align=left | Disc.: NEAT || 
|- id="2002 TW150" bgcolor=#E9E9E9
| 1 ||  || MBA-M || 18.3 || data-sort-value="0.65" | 650 m || multiple || 2002–2020 || 04 Jan 2020 || 37 || align=left | Disc.: NEAT || 
|- id="2002 TK151" bgcolor=#fefefe
| 1 ||  || MBA-I || 18.3 || data-sort-value="0.65" | 650 m || multiple || 2002–2020 || 24 Jan 2020 || 73 || align=left | Disc.: NEAT || 
|- id="2002 TO151" bgcolor=#E9E9E9
| 0 ||  || MBA-M || 18.0 || 1.1 km || multiple || 2002–2020 || 10 Dec 2020 || 33 || align=left | Disc.: NEAT || 
|- id="2002 TU151" bgcolor=#fefefe
| 0 ||  || MBA-I || 18.9 || data-sort-value="0.49" | 490 m || multiple || 2002–2017 || 14 Dec 2017 || 59 || align=left | Disc.: NEATAlt.: 2013 RH12 || 
|- id="2002 TZ151" bgcolor=#d6d6d6
| 0 ||  || MBA-O || 16.70 || 2.5 km || multiple || 2002–2021 || 07 Jul 2021 || 153 || align=left | Disc.: NEATAlt.: 2007 RZ44 || 
|- id="2002 TL152" bgcolor=#fefefe
| 0 ||  || MBA-I || 18.5 || data-sort-value="0.59" | 590 m || multiple || 2001–2020 || 20 Nov 2020 || 80 || align=left | Disc.: NEAT || 
|- id="2002 TR152" bgcolor=#E9E9E9
| 0 ||  || MBA-M || 17.3 || 1.5 km || multiple || 1998–2019 || 30 Nov 2019 || 216 || align=left | Disc.: NEATAlt.: 2015 VU102 || 
|- id="2002 TS152" bgcolor=#E9E9E9
| 0 ||  || MBA-M || 17.5 || 1.3 km || multiple || 2002–2021 || 18 Jan 2021 || 125 || align=left | Disc.: NEATAlt.: 2005 EG305 || 
|- id="2002 TU152" bgcolor=#d6d6d6
| 1 ||  || MBA-O || 17.2 || 2.0 km || multiple || 2002–2018 || 08 Nov 2018 || 61 || align=left | Disc.: NEAT || 
|- id="2002 TV152" bgcolor=#fefefe
| 0 ||  || MBA-I || 18.0 || data-sort-value="0.75" | 750 m || multiple || 2002–2020 || 11 Dec 2020 || 87 || align=left | Disc.: NEATAlt.: 2016 PN50 || 
|- id="2002 TY152" bgcolor=#d6d6d6
| 1 ||  || HIL || 16.4 || 2.9 km || multiple || 2002–2018 || 17 Nov 2018 || 61 || align=left | Disc.: NEATAlt.: 2010 OA16 || 
|- id="2002 TJ153" bgcolor=#d6d6d6
| 0 ||  || MBA-O || 15.87 || 3.7 km || multiple || 2000–2021 || 31 Mar 2021 || 191 || align=left | Disc.: NEAT || 
|- id="2002 TQ153" bgcolor=#fefefe
| 0 ||  || MBA-I || 18.32 || data-sort-value="0.64" | 640 m || multiple || 2002–2021 || 08 May 2021 || 108 || align=left | Disc.: NEATAlt.: 2014 DZ122 || 
|- id="2002 TB154" bgcolor=#fefefe
| 0 ||  || MBA-I || 18.1 || data-sort-value="0.71" | 710 m || multiple || 2002–2017 || 26 Nov 2017 || 58 || align=left | Disc.: NEATAlt.: 2016 GA228 || 
|- id="2002 TM154" bgcolor=#E9E9E9
| 0 ||  || MBA-M || 17.21 || 1.1 km || multiple || 2002–2021 || 09 Apr 2021 || 207 || align=left | Disc.: LINEAR || 
|- id="2002 TN154" bgcolor=#E9E9E9
| 0 ||  || MBA-M || 17.2 || 1.1 km || multiple || 2002–2019 || 21 Dec 2019 || 111 || align=left | Disc.: NEATAlt.: 2002 TL351 || 
|- id="2002 TX155" bgcolor=#E9E9E9
| 1 ||  || MBA-M || 17.7 || data-sort-value="0.86" | 860 m || multiple || 2002–2019 || 17 Dec 2019 || 59 || align=left | Disc.: LPL/Spacewatch II || 
|- id="2002 TY155" bgcolor=#E9E9E9
| 1 ||  || MBA-M || 18.1 || 1.0 km || multiple || 2002–2019 || 01 Aug 2019 || 91 || align=left | Disc.: LPL/Spacewatch IIAlt.: 2015 RM31 || 
|- id="2002 TC156" bgcolor=#E9E9E9
| 0 ||  || MBA-M || 16.92 || 1.7 km || multiple || 1998–2021 || 14 Apr 2021 || 269 || align=left | Disc.: NEAT || 
|- id="2002 TG156" bgcolor=#E9E9E9
| 0 ||  || MBA-M || 17.29 || 1.5 km || multiple || 2000–2022 || 26 Jan 2022 || 109 || align=left | Disc.: NEAT || 
|- id="2002 TP156" bgcolor=#E9E9E9
| 0 ||  || MBA-M || 17.7 || 1.2 km || multiple || 2002–2019 || 05 Nov 2019 || 60 || align=left | Disc.: NEAT || 
|- id="2002 TR157" bgcolor=#fefefe
| 0 ||  || MBA-I || 17.8 || data-sort-value="0.82" | 820 m || multiple || 2002–2020 || 07 Dec 2020 || 134 || align=left | Disc.: NEATAlt.: 2012 KR14 || 
|- id="2002 TX158" bgcolor=#FA8072
| 0 ||  || MCA || 18.93 || data-sort-value="0.49" | 490 m || multiple || 2002–2021 || 01 Jul 2021 || 76 || align=left | Disc.: NEAT || 
|- id="2002 TY158" bgcolor=#E9E9E9
| 0 ||  || MBA-M || 16.73 || 3.4 km || multiple || 2002–2022 || 27 Jan 2022 || 202 || align=left | Disc.: NEATAlt.: 2010 PY28, 2011 RR16 || 
|- id="2002 TQ160" bgcolor=#d6d6d6
| 0 ||  || MBA-O || 16.6 || 2.7 km || multiple || 2002–2020 || 28 Jan 2020 || 109 || align=left | Disc.: NEATAlt.: 2013 TZ1 || 
|- id="2002 TW160" bgcolor=#d6d6d6
| 0 ||  || MBA-O || 16.35 || 3.0 km || multiple || 2002–2021 || 17 Apr 2021 || 218 || align=left | Disc.: NEATAlt.: 2014 YJ4 || 
|- id="2002 TY160" bgcolor=#fefefe
| 0 ||  || HUN || 18.69 || data-sort-value="0.54" | 540 m || multiple || 2002–2021 || 13 Dec 2021 || 72 || align=left | Disc.: NEATAlt.: 2012 HV30 || 
|- id="2002 TL161" bgcolor=#d6d6d6
| 0 ||  || MBA-O || 16.60 || 2.7 km || multiple || 2002–2021 || 15 Apr 2021 || 104 || align=left | Disc.: NEAT || 
|- id="2002 TA162" bgcolor=#E9E9E9
| 2 ||  || MBA-M || 17.8 || data-sort-value="0.82" | 820 m || multiple || 2002–2020 || 23 Jan 2020 || 29 || align=left | Disc.: NEAT || 
|- id="2002 TF162" bgcolor=#d6d6d6
| 0 ||  || MBA-O || 16.4 || 2.9 km || multiple || 2002–2021 || 13 Jun 2021 || 89 || align=left | Disc.: NEAT || 
|- id="2002 TH163" bgcolor=#d6d6d6
| 0 ||  || MBA-O || 16.2 || 3.2 km || multiple || 2002–2021 || 17 Jan 2021 || 104 || align=left | Disc.: NEAT || 
|- id="2002 TP163" bgcolor=#d6d6d6
| 0 ||  || MBA-O || 16.41 || 2.9 km || multiple || 2000–2021 || 09 Apr 2021 || 108 || align=left | Disc.: NEAT || 
|- id="2002 TQ163" bgcolor=#d6d6d6
| 0 ||  || MBA-O || 16.13 || 3.3 km || multiple || 2002–2021 || 06 Apr 2021 || 214 || align=left | Disc.: NEAT || 
|- id="2002 TN166" bgcolor=#d6d6d6
| 0 ||  || MBA-O || 16.3 || 3.1 km || multiple || 2002–2021 || 04 Jan 2021 || 101 || align=left | Disc.: NEATAlt.: 2014 XQ36 || 
|- id="2002 TS166" bgcolor=#E9E9E9
| 0 ||  || MBA-M || 17.5 || 1.3 km || multiple || 2002–2019 || 17 Nov 2019 || 192 || align=left | Disc.: NEATAlt.: 2015 VX95 || 
|- id="2002 TM167" bgcolor=#fefefe
| 0 ||  || MBA-I || 17.79 || data-sort-value="0.82" | 820 m || multiple || 2002–2021 || 09 May 2021 || 153 || align=left | Disc.: NEAT || 
|- id="2002 TN167" bgcolor=#fefefe
| 0 ||  || MBA-I || 17.40 || data-sort-value="0.98" | 980 m || multiple || 2002–2021 || 07 Apr 2021 || 317 || align=left | Disc.: NEAT || 
|- id="2002 TU167" bgcolor=#d6d6d6
| 0 ||  || MBA-O || 16.07 || 3.4 km || multiple || 2002–2021 || 06 Apr 2021 || 213 || align=left | Disc.: NEAT || 
|- id="2002 TY168" bgcolor=#E9E9E9
| 0 ||  || MBA-M || 17.2 || 1.5 km || multiple || 2002–2021 || 17 Jan 2021 || 77 || align=left | Disc.: NEAT || 
|- id="2002 TD169" bgcolor=#fefefe
| 2 ||  || MBA-I || 18.4 || data-sort-value="0.62" | 620 m || multiple || 2002–2021 || 18 Jan 2021 || 63 || align=left | Disc.: NEAT || 
|- id="2002 TX169" bgcolor=#E9E9E9
| 0 ||  || MBA-M || 16.35 || 2.3 km || multiple || 2001–2022 || 27 Jan 2022 || 325 || align=left | Disc.: NEATAlt.: 2011 UM161 || 
|- id="2002 TE170" bgcolor=#d6d6d6
| 0 ||  || MBA-O || 16.4 || 2.9 km || multiple || 2002–2019 || 24 Oct 2019 || 102 || align=left | Disc.: NEAT || 
|- id="2002 TP171" bgcolor=#d6d6d6
| 0 ||  || MBA-O || 16.4 || 2.9 km || multiple || 2002–2018 || 12 Oct 2018 || 122 || align=left | Disc.: NEAT || 
|- id="2002 TD173" bgcolor=#E9E9E9
| 0 ||  || MBA-M || 16.8 || 1.8 km || multiple || 2002–2020 || 03 Feb 2020 || 240 || align=left | Disc.: LINEAR || 
|- id="2002 TO173" bgcolor=#fefefe
| 0 ||  || MBA-I || 17.8 || data-sort-value="0.82" | 820 m || multiple || 2002–2021 || 08 Jan 2021 || 141 || align=left | Disc.: LINEAR || 
|- id="2002 TX176" bgcolor=#E9E9E9
| 0 ||  || MBA-M || 17.0 || 1.7 km || multiple || 2001–2021 || 17 Jan 2021 || 126 || align=left | Disc.: NEAT || 
|- id="2002 TO179" bgcolor=#FA8072
| 0 ||  || MCA || 18.3 || data-sort-value="0.65" | 650 m || multiple || 2002–2020 || 02 Feb 2020 || 59 || align=left | Disc.: NEAT || 
|- id="2002 TA182" bgcolor=#d6d6d6
| 0 ||  || MBA-O || 15.18 || 3.5 km || multiple || 2001–2021 || 30 Jul 2021 || 443 || align=left | Disc.: NEATAlt.: 2010 LV3 || 
|- id="2002 TG182" bgcolor=#d6d6d6
| 0 ||  || MBA-O || 16.67 || 2.6 km || multiple || 2002–2021 || 18 Apr 2021 || 141 || align=left | Disc.: NEAT || 
|- id="2002 TB183" bgcolor=#E9E9E9
| 0 ||  || MBA-M || 17.67 || 1.2 km || multiple || 2002–2021 || 09 Apr 2021 || 198 || align=left | Disc.: LINEAR || 
|- id="2002 TD187" bgcolor=#E9E9E9
| 0 ||  || MBA-M || 17.43 || 1.4 km || multiple || 2001–2020 || 20 Dec 2020 || 140 || align=left | Disc.: LINEARAlt.: 2011 UJ160 || 
|- id="2002 TV187" bgcolor=#fefefe
| 0 ||  || MBA-I || 18.3 || data-sort-value="0.65" | 650 m || multiple || 2002–2020 || 24 Jun 2020 || 109 || align=left | Disc.: LINEARAlt.: 2013 PN68 || 
|- id="2002 TP190" bgcolor=#FA8072
| 1 ||  || HUN || 18.5 || data-sort-value="0.59" | 590 m || multiple || 2002–2020 || 19 Dec 2020 || 239 || align=left | Disc.: NEATAlt.: 2006 FG9 || 
|- id="2002 TQ190" bgcolor=#FA8072
| 1 ||  || MCA || 18.9 || data-sort-value="0.49" | 490 m || multiple || 2002–2020 || 11 Oct 2020 || 77 || align=left | Disc.: NEAT || 
|- id="2002 TE192" bgcolor=#E9E9E9
| 0 ||  || MBA-M || 17.0 || 1.5 km || multiple || 2002–2021 || 04 Jan 2021 || 165 || align=left | Disc.: LONEOSAlt.: 2012 BQ35 || 
|- id="2002 TC193" bgcolor=#fefefe
| 0 ||  || MBA-I || 17.62 || data-sort-value="0.64" | 900 m || multiple || 2002-2021 || 09 Apr 2021 || 39 || align=left | Disc.: NEATAlt.: 2016 AQ362Added on 21 August 2021 || 
|- id="2002 TV193" bgcolor=#fefefe
| 0 ||  || MBA-I || 17.8 || data-sort-value="0.82" | 820 m || multiple || 1995–2021 || 05 Jan 2021 || 219 || align=left | Disc.: LINEAR || 
|- id="2002 TW193" bgcolor=#E9E9E9
| 0 ||  || MBA-M || 17.2 || 1.5 km || multiple || 2002–2017 || 20 Jan 2017 || 161 || align=left | Disc.: LINEARAlt.: 2015 RU87 || 
|- id="2002 TX193" bgcolor=#d6d6d6
| 0 ||  || MBA-O || 15.72 || 4.0 km || multiple || 2002–2022 || 27 Jan 2022 || 201 || align=left | Disc.: LINEAR || 
|- id="2002 TE194" bgcolor=#fefefe
| 0 ||  || MBA-I || 17.9 || data-sort-value="0.78" | 780 m || multiple || 2002–2021 || 15 Jan 2021 || 165 || align=left | Disc.: LINEARAlt.: 2015 HH138 || 
|- id="2002 TX196" bgcolor=#d6d6d6
| 0 ||  || MBA-O || 15.8 || 3.9 km || multiple || 2002–2020 || 22 Dec 2020 || 159 || align=left | Disc.: LINEAR || 
|- id="2002 TK197" bgcolor=#E9E9E9
| 0 ||  || MBA-M || 17.5 || 1.3 km || multiple || 2002–2019 || 15 Nov 2019 || 202 || align=left | Disc.: LINEARAlt.: 2014 HE157 || 
|- id="2002 TH198" bgcolor=#E9E9E9
| 1 ||  || MBA-M || 17.7 || 1.2 km || multiple || 2002–2019 || 25 Nov 2019 || 65 || align=left | Disc.: NEAT || 
|- id="2002 TZ200" bgcolor=#E9E9E9
| 4 ||  || MBA-M || 19.2 || data-sort-value="0.43" | 430 m || multiple || 2002–2020 || 24 Jan 2020 || 17 || align=left | Disc.: LPL/Spacewatch IIAdded on 17 June 2021 || 
|- id="2002 TD201" bgcolor=#fefefe
| 0 ||  || MBA-I || 18.47 || data-sort-value="0.60" | 600 m || multiple || 2002–2021 || 30 Jul 2021 || 109 || align=left | Disc.: LPL/Spacewatch II || 
|- id="2002 TE201" bgcolor=#d6d6d6
| 0 ||  || MBA-O || 16.9 || 2.3 km || multiple || 2002–2019 || 04 Dec 2019 || 97 || align=left | Disc.: LPL/Spacewatch II || 
|- id="2002 TG201" bgcolor=#E9E9E9
| 0 ||  || MBA-M || 17.61 || data-sort-value="0.89" | 890 m || multiple || 2002–2021 || 11 Jun 2021 || 96 || align=left | Disc.: LPL/Spacewatch II || 
|- id="2002 TJ201" bgcolor=#d6d6d6
| 0 ||  || MBA-O || 17.6 || 1.7 km || multiple || 2002–2021 || 18 Jan 2021 || 47 || align=left | Disc.: LPL/Spacewatch IIAlt.: 2002 TC202, 2019 SC61 || 
|- id="2002 TL201" bgcolor=#fefefe
| 2 ||  || MBA-I || 19.0 || data-sort-value="0.47" | 470 m || multiple || 2002–2020 || 11 Jul 2020 || 25 || align=left | Disc.: LPL/Spacewatch IIAdded on 21 August 2021 || 
|- id="2002 TP201" bgcolor=#fefefe
| 0 ||  || MBA-I || 18.5 || data-sort-value="0.59" | 590 m || multiple || 2002–2020 || 20 Oct 2020 || 74 || align=left | Disc.: LPL/Spacewatch IIAdded on 22 July 2020Alt.: 2019 JP28 || 
|- id="2002 TF202" bgcolor=#d6d6d6
| 0 ||  || MBA-O || 15.79 || 3.9 km || multiple || 2002–2021 || 04 Aug 2021 || 331 || align=left | Disc.: George Obs.Alt.: 2006 JQ45, 2007 TU263, 2010 MO136, 2015 CY61 || 
|- id="2002 TX204" bgcolor=#E9E9E9
| 0 ||  || MBA-M || 17.5 || 1.3 km || multiple || 2002–2019 || 19 Dec 2019 || 93 || align=left | Disc.: LINEAR || 
|- id="2002 TT206" bgcolor=#FA8072
| 1 ||  || MCA || 17.3 || 1.5 km || multiple || 2002–2020 || 18 May 2020 || 239 || align=left | Disc.: LINEARAlt.: 2002 TF267 || 
|- id="2002 TU209" bgcolor=#E9E9E9
| 0 ||  || MBA-M || 16.93 || 1.7 km || multiple || 2002–2021 || 02 Apr 2021 || 224 || align=left | Disc.: AMOS || 
|- id="2002 TV209" bgcolor=#FA8072
| 1 ||  || MCA || 19.21 || data-sort-value="0.43" | 430 m || multiple || 2002–2021 || 28 Nov 2021 || 42 || align=left | Disc.: AMOS || 
|- id="2002 TZ209" bgcolor=#fefefe
| 1 ||  || MBA-I || 17.9 || data-sort-value="0.78" | 780 m || multiple || 2002–2019 || 26 Nov 2019 || 115 || align=left | Disc.: NEAT || 
|- id="2002 TC211" bgcolor=#d6d6d6
| 0 ||  || MBA-O || 16.49 || 2.8 km || multiple || 2002–2021 || 06 Apr 2021 || 226 || align=left | Disc.: LINEAR || 
|- id="2002 TT212" bgcolor=#E9E9E9
| 0 ||  || MBA-M || 16.24 || 2.4 km || multiple || 2001–2022 || 06 Jan 2022 || 348 || align=left | Disc.: AMOS || 
|- id="2002 TC213" bgcolor=#d6d6d6
| 0 ||  || MBA-O || 15.76 || 3.9 km || multiple || 2002–2021 || 04 May 2021 || 251 || align=left | Disc.: AMOSAlt.: 2010 JV42 || 
|- id="2002 TX213" bgcolor=#FA8072
| 1 ||  || MCA || 18.7 || data-sort-value="0.54" | 540 m || multiple || 2002–2020 || 27 Jan 2020 || 57 || align=left | Disc.: LINEAR || 
|- id="2002 TF215" bgcolor=#E9E9E9
| 0 ||  || MBA-M || 17.1 || 1.6 km || multiple || 2002–2021 || 17 Jan 2021 || 148 || align=left | Disc.: LINEAR || 
|- id="2002 TZ215" bgcolor=#fefefe
| 0 ||  || MBA-I || 18.4 || data-sort-value="0.62" | 620 m || multiple || 1995–2019 || 29 Dec 2019 || 84 || align=left | Disc.: NEAT || 
|- id="2002 TE216" bgcolor=#E9E9E9
| 0 ||  || MBA-M || 17.29 || 1.5 km || multiple || 2002–2021 || 01 Jun 2021 || 83 || align=left | Disc.: NEAT || 
|- id="2002 TJ217" bgcolor=#fefefe
| 0 ||  || MBA-I || 18.8 || data-sort-value="0.52" | 520 m || multiple || 2002–2020 || 05 Nov 2020 || 47 || align=left | Disc.: NEAT || 
|- id="2002 TE218" bgcolor=#FA8072
| 0 ||  || MCA || 18.52 || data-sort-value="0.59" | 590 m || multiple || 2002–2021 || 15 Jun 2021 || 144 || align=left | Disc.: LINEARMBA at MPC || 
|- id="2002 TC219" bgcolor=#E9E9E9
| 0 ||  || MBA-M || 16.87 || 1.8 km || multiple || 2002–2021 || 16 Apr 2021 || 227 || align=left | Disc.: LINEAR || 
|- id="2002 TT220" bgcolor=#E9E9E9
| 0 ||  || MBA-M || 17.3 || 1.5 km || multiple || 2002–2021 || 07 Jan 2021 || 219 || align=left | Disc.: LINEARAlt.: 2015 TW243 || 
|- id="2002 TF221" bgcolor=#d6d6d6
| 0 ||  || MBA-O || 16.00 || 3.5 km || multiple || 2002–2021 || 09 May 2021 || 253 || align=left | Disc.: LINEAR || 
|- id="2002 TG221" bgcolor=#E9E9E9
| 0 ||  || MBA-M || 17.14 || 1.1 km || multiple || 1998–2021 || 09 Apr 2021 || 141 || align=left | Disc.: LINEAR || 
|- id="2002 TC222" bgcolor=#fefefe
| 0 ||  || MBA-I || 18.30 || data-sort-value="0.65" | 650 m || multiple || 2002–2021 || 13 May 2021 || 148 || align=left | Disc.: LINEARAlt.: 2011 FG101 || 
|- id="2002 TA228" bgcolor=#E9E9E9
| 0 ||  || MBA-M || 17.4 || 1.8 km || multiple || 2001–2020 || 20 Dec 2020 || 221 || align=left | Disc.: LINEAR || 
|- id="2002 TB230" bgcolor=#d6d6d6
| 1 ||  || MBA-O || 17.3 || 1.9 km || multiple || 2002–2019 || 05 Nov 2019 || 45 || align=left | Disc.: LPL/Spacewatch II || 
|- id="2002 TE230" bgcolor=#d6d6d6
| 0 ||  || MBA-O || 17.3 || 1.9 km || multiple || 2002–2021 || 18 Jan 2021 || 78 || align=left | Disc.: LPL/Spacewatch IIAlt.: 2006 KK142 || 
|- id="2002 TG232" bgcolor=#d6d6d6
| 0 ||  || MBA-O || 16.49 || 2.8 km || multiple || 2002–2021 || 08 Jul 2021 || 70 || align=left | Disc.: LINEAR || 
|- id="2002 TP232" bgcolor=#d6d6d6
| 0 ||  || MBA-O || 16.61 || 2.7 km || multiple || 2002–2021 || 09 Aug 2021 || 115 || align=left | Disc.: LINEARAlt.: 2007 VR92 || 
|- id="2002 TW234" bgcolor=#E9E9E9
| 1 ||  || MBA-M || 17.5 || 1.3 km || multiple || 2002–2019 || 15 Nov 2019 || 112 || align=left | Disc.: LINEAR || 
|- id="2002 TY234" bgcolor=#E9E9E9
| 0 ||  || MBA-M || 16.3 || 3.1 km || multiple || 2002–2020 || 08 Dec 2020 || 178 || align=left | Disc.: LINEAR || 
|- id="2002 TP235" bgcolor=#E9E9E9
| 0 ||  || MBA-M || 17.69 || data-sort-value="0.86" | 860 m || multiple || 2002–2021 || 09 Apr 2021 || 65 || align=left | Disc.: LINEAR || 
|- id="2002 TJ236" bgcolor=#E9E9E9
| 0 ||  || MBA-M || 17.28 || 1.5 km || multiple || 2002–2021 || 09 May 2021 || 103 || align=left | Disc.: LINEAR || 
|- id="2002 TM241" bgcolor=#fefefe
| 0 ||  || MBA-I || 17.9 || data-sort-value="0.78" | 780 m || multiple || 2002–2020 || 21 Oct 2020 || 168 || align=left | Disc.: AMOS || 
|- id="2002 TM243" bgcolor=#fefefe
| 0 ||  || MBA-I || 17.76 || data-sort-value="0.83" | 830 m || multiple || 2002–2021 || 08 Apr 2021 || 167 || align=left | Disc.: LPL/Spacewatch IIAlt.: 2016 TL78 || 
|- id="2002 TF244" bgcolor=#fefefe
| 0 ||  || MBA-I || 18.62 || data-sort-value="0.56" | 560 m || multiple || 2002–2021 || 09 Nov 2021 || 110 || align=left | Disc.: NEATAlt.: 2013 CW188 || 
|- id="2002 TE245" bgcolor=#E9E9E9
| 0 ||  || MBA-M || 17.0 || 1.7 km || multiple || 2002–2019 || 16 Dec 2019 || 192 || align=left | Disc.: AMOS || 
|- id="2002 TG246" bgcolor=#d6d6d6
| 0 ||  || MBA-O || 15.92 || 3.6 km || multiple || 2002–2021 || 11 May 2021 || 180 || align=left | Disc.: LONEOSAlt.: 2013 UT5 || 
|- id="2002 TD247" bgcolor=#E9E9E9
| 0 ||  || MBA-M || 17.6 || 1.3 km || multiple || 2002–2019 || 03 Oct 2019 || 93 || align=left | Disc.: LPL/Spacewatch IIAlt.: 2010 LX105 || 
|- id="2002 TK247" bgcolor=#d6d6d6
| 0 ||  || HIL || 15.8 || 3.9 km || multiple || 2002–2018 || 15 Dec 2018 || 61 || align=left | Disc.: LPL/Spacewatch II || 
|- id="2002 TY247" bgcolor=#d6d6d6
| 0 ||  || MBA-O || 16.48 || 2.8 km || multiple || 2002–2021 || 03 May 2021 || 210 || align=left | Disc.: NEATAlt.: 2005 EK294, 2005 FO12 || 
|- id="2002 TA248" bgcolor=#E9E9E9
| 0 ||  || MBA-M || 16.42 || 1.5 km || multiple || 2002–2021 || 07 Apr 2021 || 115 || align=left | Disc.: NEATAlt.: 2010 NY128, 2014 SV245 || 
|- id="2002 TN248" bgcolor=#E9E9E9
| 0 ||  || MBA-M || 16.87 || 1.8 km || multiple || 2002–2021 || 03 Apr 2021 || 217 || align=left | Disc.: NEATAlt.: 2013 GE66 || 
|- id="2002 TH249" bgcolor=#d6d6d6
| 0 ||  || MBA-O || 16.26 || 3.1 km || multiple || 2002–2021 || 13 May 2021 || 169 || align=left | Disc.: LPL/Spacewatch IIAlt.: 2010 MO15 || 
|- id="2002 TR249" bgcolor=#fefefe
| 0 ||  || MBA-I || 18.89 || data-sort-value="0.50" | 500 m || multiple || 2002–2021 || 27 Sep 2021 || 54 || align=left | Disc.: LPL/Spacewatch II || 
|- id="2002 TV249" bgcolor=#fefefe
| 0 ||  || MBA-I || 18.38 || data-sort-value="0.63" | 630 m || multiple || 2002–2022 || 06 Jan 2022 || 78 || align=left | Disc.: LPL/Spacewatch IIAlt.: 2013 QA49 || 
|- id="2002 TG250" bgcolor=#fefefe
| 1 ||  || MBA-I || 17.7 || data-sort-value="0.86" | 860 m || multiple || 1995–2020 || 17 Dec 2020 || 120 || align=left | Disc.: LINEAR || 
|- id="2002 TJ252" bgcolor=#fefefe
| 0 ||  || MBA-I || 18.23 || data-sort-value="0.67" | 670 m || multiple || 2002–2021 || 08 May 2021 || 66 || align=left | Disc.: LONEOS || 
|- id="2002 TS252" bgcolor=#d6d6d6
| 0 ||  || MBA-O || 15.5 || 4.0 km || multiple || 2002–2021 || 17 Jan 2021 || 244 || align=left | Disc.: LPL/Spacewatch IIAlt.: 2010 HL12, 2011 FM59 || 
|- id="2002 TK253" bgcolor=#fefefe
| 0 ||  || MBA-I || 17.5 || data-sort-value="0.94" | 940 m || multiple || 2002–2021 || 13 Jun 2021 || 197 || align=left | Disc.: LPL/Spacewatch IIAlt.: 2012 RS18 || 
|- id="2002 TJ255" bgcolor=#E9E9E9
| 0 ||  || MBA-M || 17.6 || 2.2 km || multiple || 2002–2020 || 07 Dec 2020 || 102 || align=left | Disc.: LINEARAlt.: 2010 PK14 || 
|- id="2002 TK255" bgcolor=#E9E9E9
| 0 ||  || MBA-M || 17.53 || 1.7 km || multiple || 2002–2022 || 11 Jan 2022 || 44 || align=left | Disc.: LONEOS || 
|- id="2002 TF256" bgcolor=#d6d6d6
| 0 ||  || MBA-O || 16.25 || 3.1 km || multiple || 1991–2021 || 14 Apr 2021 || 179 || align=left | Disc.: LINEAR || 
|- id="2002 TA257" bgcolor=#E9E9E9
| 0 ||  || MBA-M || 17.8 || 1.2 km || multiple || 2002–2020 || 23 Jan 2020 || 130 || align=left | Disc.: LINEARAlt.: 2015 UY83 || 
|- id="2002 TQ257" bgcolor=#FA8072
| 3 ||  || MCA || 18.2 || data-sort-value="0.68" | 680 m || multiple || 2002–2016 || 06 Dec 2016 || 129 || align=left | Disc.: LINEAR || 
|- id="2002 TM260" bgcolor=#E9E9E9
| 0 ||  || MBA-M || 16.95 || 1.7 km || multiple || 2002–2021 || 01 Apr 2021 || 256 || align=left | Disc.: LPL/Spacewatch II || 
|- id="2002 TX261" bgcolor=#fefefe
| 0 ||  || MBA-I || 17.81 || data-sort-value="0.81" | 810 m || multiple || 2002–2021 || 11 Apr 2021 || 88 || align=left | Disc.: NEATAlt.: 2009 VL38 || 
|- id="2002 TJ262" bgcolor=#d6d6d6
| 0 ||  || MBA-O || 16.25 || 3.1 km || multiple || 2002–2021 || 08 May 2021 || 166 || align=left | Disc.: NEAT || 
|- id="2002 TA263" bgcolor=#d6d6d6
| 0 ||  || MBA-O || 16.17 || 3.2 km || multiple || 2002–2021 || 09 May 2021 || 214 || align=left | Disc.: NEATAlt.: 2008 YW160 || 
|- id="2002 TJ263" bgcolor=#d6d6d6
| 0 ||  || MBA-O || 16.3 || 3.1 km || multiple || 2002–2020 || 28 Jan 2020 || 118 || align=left | Disc.: LINEARAlt.: 2010 CH85 || 
|- id="2002 TM263" bgcolor=#d6d6d6
| 0 ||  || MBA-O || 16.7 || 2.5 km || multiple || 2002–2019 || 31 Dec 2019 || 45 || align=left | Disc.: LINEARAdded on 22 July 2020 || 
|- id="2002 TS263" bgcolor=#E9E9E9
| 0 ||  || MBA-M || 17.56 || 1.3 km || multiple || 2002–2021 || 15 Apr 2021 || 116 || align=left | Disc.: LINEAR || 
|- id="2002 TT264" bgcolor=#E9E9E9
| 1 ||  || MBA-M || 17.2 || 1.5 km || multiple || 2002–2020 || 25 Jan 2020 || 234 || align=left | Disc.: LINEAR || 
|- id="2002 TK268" bgcolor=#d6d6d6
| 0 ||  || MBA-O || 15.58 || 4.3 km || multiple || 2000–2022 || 27 Jan 2022 || 327 || align=left | Disc.: LINEARAlt.: 2007 PU3 || 
|- id="2002 TA269" bgcolor=#E9E9E9
| 0 ||  || MBA-M || 17.0 || 1.7 km || multiple || 2002–2019 || 28 Dec 2019 || 161 || align=left | Disc.: LINEAR || 
|- id="2002 TM269" bgcolor=#E9E9E9
| 0 ||  || MBA-M || 16.8 || 1.8 km || multiple || 2002–2021 || 16 Jan 2021 || 237 || align=left | Disc.: LINEAR || 
|- id="2002 TS269" bgcolor=#fefefe
| 0 ||  || MBA-I || 17.31 || 1.0 km || multiple || 2002–2022 || 23 Jan 2022 || 301 || align=left | Disc.: LINEAR || 
|- id="2002 TV269" bgcolor=#E9E9E9
| 0 ||  || MBA-M || 16.5 || 2.1 km || multiple || 2002–2021 || 07 Apr 2021 || 342 || align=left | Disc.: LINEARAlt.: 2014 JX47 || 
|- id="2002 TX270" bgcolor=#E9E9E9
| 0 ||  || MBA-M || 17.09 || 2.1 km || multiple || 2002–2022 || 10 Jan 2022 || 163 || align=left | Disc.: LINEARAlt.: 2011 SB230 || 
|- id="2002 TC271" bgcolor=#d6d6d6
| 0 ||  || MBA-O || 15.9 || 3.7 km || multiple || 2002–2020 || 15 Jan 2020 || 160 || align=left | Disc.: LINEAR || 
|- id="2002 TO271" bgcolor=#fefefe
| 1 ||  || MBA-I || 18.4 || data-sort-value="0.62" | 620 m || multiple || 2002–2021 || 05 Jan 2021 || 126 || align=left | Disc.: LINEAR || 
|- id="2002 TG273" bgcolor=#fefefe
| 0 ||  || MBA-I || 18.5 || data-sort-value="0.59" | 590 m || multiple || 2002–2020 || 15 Feb 2020 || 103 || align=left | Disc.: LINEARAlt.: 2015 TB260 || 
|- id="2002 TB274" bgcolor=#fefefe
| 1 ||  || MBA-I || 18.1 || data-sort-value="0.71" | 710 m || multiple || 2002–2021 || 08 Jan 2021 || 191 || align=left | Disc.: LINEAR || 
|- id="2002 TB277" bgcolor=#E9E9E9
| 1 ||  || MBA-M || 18.2 || data-sort-value="0.96" | 960 m || multiple || 2002–2020 || 07 Dec 2020 || 52 || align=left | Disc.: NEATAlt.: 2015 RX119 || 
|- id="2002 TK285" bgcolor=#FA8072
| 0 ||  || MCA || 17.8 || 1.2 km || multiple || 2002–2019 || 02 Dec 2019 || 71 || align=left | Disc.: LINEAR || 
|- id="2002 TG291" bgcolor=#FA8072
| 1 ||  || MCA || 18.2 || data-sort-value="0.68" | 680 m || multiple || 2002–2020 || 23 Mar 2020 || 226 || align=left | Disc.: LINEAR || 
|- id="2002 TB294" bgcolor=#E9E9E9
| 1 ||  || MBA-M || 17.8 || 1.2 km || multiple || 2002–2020 || 31 Jan 2020 || 96 || align=left | Disc.: LINEAR || 
|- id="2002 TN296" bgcolor=#fefefe
| 0 ||  || MBA-I || 18.3 || data-sort-value="0.65" | 650 m || multiple || 2001–2021 || 09 Jan 2021 || 74 || align=left | Disc.: LINEAR || 
|- id="2002 TO296" bgcolor=#FA8072
| 2 ||  || MCA || 19.0 || data-sort-value="0.47" | 470 m || multiple || 2002–2020 || 21 Jun 2020 || 53 || align=left | Disc.: LINEAR || 
|- id="2002 TA300" bgcolor=#E9E9E9
| 0 ||  || MBA-M || 17.5 || data-sort-value="0.94" | 940 m || multiple || 1998–2019 || 17 Dec 2019 || 63 || align=left | Disc.: NEAT || 
|- id="2002 TM300" bgcolor=#E9E9E9
| 0 ||  || MBA-M || 18.10 || 1.0 km || multiple || 2002–2021 || 11 Apr 2021 || 179 || align=left | Disc.: NEATAlt.: 2008 EY27 || 
|- id="2002 TZ300" bgcolor=#C7FF8F
| E ||  || CEN || 8.7 || 62 km || single || 1 day || 04 Dec 2002 || 73 || align=left | Disc.: Mauna Kea Obs. || 
|- id="2002 TA301" bgcolor=#C2E0FF
| E ||  || TNO || 10.2 || 31 km || single || 1 day || 07 Oct 2002 || 71 || align=left | Disc.: Mauna Kea Obs.LoUTNOs, cubewano? || 
|- id="2002 TB301" bgcolor=#C2E0FF
| E ||  || TNO || 9.1 || 52 km || single || 1 day || 07 Oct 2002 || 73 || align=left | Disc.: Mauna Kea Obs.LoUTNOs, cubewano? || 
|- id="2002 TC301" bgcolor=#C2E0FF
| E ||  || TNO || 9.5 || 43 km || single || 1 day || 07 Oct 2002 || 27 || align=left | Disc.: Mauna Kea Obs.LoUTNOs, cubewano? || 
|- id="2002 TD301" bgcolor=#C2E0FF
| E ||  || TNO || 10.6 || 26 km || single || 1 day || 07 Oct 2002 || 26 || align=left | Disc.: Mauna Kea Obs.LoUTNOs, cubewano? || 
|- id="2002 TE301" bgcolor=#C2E0FF
| E ||  || TNO || 10.9 || 23 km || single || 1 day || 07 Oct 2002 || 53 || align=left | Disc.: Mauna Kea Obs.LoUTNOs, cubewano? || 
|- id="2002 TF301" bgcolor=#C2E0FF
| E ||  || TNO || 10.9 || 23 km || single || 1 day || 07 Oct 2002 || 47 || align=left | Disc.: Mauna Kea Obs.LoUTNOs, cubewano? || 
|- id="2002 TG301" bgcolor=#C2E0FF
| E ||  || TNO || 9.7 || 39 km || single || 1 day || 07 Oct 2002 || 78 || align=left | Disc.: Mauna Kea Obs.LoUTNOs, cubewano? || 
|- id="2002 TH301" bgcolor=#C2E0FF
| 2 ||  || TNO || 9.3 || 65 km || multiple || 2002–2017 || 16 Dec 2017 || 99 || align=left | Disc.: Mauna Kea Obs.LoUTNOs, plutino || 
|- id="2002 TJ301" bgcolor=#C2E0FF
| E ||  || TNO || 10.9 || 23 km || single || 1 day || 07 Oct 2002 || 41 || align=left | Disc.: Mauna Kea Obs.LoUTNOs, cubewano? || 
|- id="2002 TK301" bgcolor=#C7FF8F
| E ||  || CEN || 13.4 || 12 km || single || 1 day || 07 Oct 2002 || 81 || align=left | Disc.: Mauna Kea Obs. || 
|- id="2002 TL301" bgcolor=#C2E0FF
| E ||  || TNO || 11.1 || 21 km || single || 1 day || 07 Oct 2002 || 30 || align=left | Disc.: Mauna Kea Obs.LoUTNOs, cubewano? || 
|- id="2002 TM301" bgcolor=#C2E0FF
| E ||  || TNO || 9.7 || 54 km || single || 1 day || 07 Oct 2002 || 92 || align=left | Disc.: Mauna Kea Obs.LoUTNOs, plutino? || 
|- id="2002 TR302" bgcolor=#E9E9E9
| 0 ||  || MBA-M || 16.61 || 2.7 km || multiple || 2000–2022 || 04 Jan 2022 || 322 || align=left | Disc.: NEATAlt.: 2009 CP47, 2011 QA78, 2014 DS89 || 
|- id="2002 TN303" bgcolor=#fefefe
| 0 ||  || MBA-I || 18.94 || data-sort-value="0.49" | 490 m || multiple || 2002-2017 || 23 Oct 2017 || 43 || align=left | Disc.: NEATAlt.: 2006 WS215 || 
|- id="2002 TQ303" bgcolor=#E9E9E9
| 2 ||  || MBA-M || 18.3 || data-sort-value="0.92" | 920 m || multiple || 2002–2019 || 28 Nov 2019 || 33 || align=left | Disc.: SDSS || 
|- id="2002 TV303" bgcolor=#E9E9E9
| 0 ||  || MBA-M || 18.3 || data-sort-value="0.92" | 920 m || multiple || 2002–2019 || 24 Oct 2019 || 39 || align=left | Disc.: SDSS || 
|- id="2002 TY303" bgcolor=#fefefe
| 0 ||  || MBA-I || 19.23 || data-sort-value="0.42" | 420 m || multiple || 2002–2021 || 01 Nov 2021 || 45 || align=left | Disc.: SDSS || 
|- id="2002 TE304" bgcolor=#E9E9E9
| 0 ||  || MBA-M || 17.7 || 1.6 km || multiple || 2002–2021 || 05 Jan 2021 || 88 || align=left | Disc.: SDSS || 
|- id="2002 TF304" bgcolor=#fefefe
| 0 ||  || MBA-I || 19.7 || data-sort-value="0.34" | 340 m || multiple || 2002–2018 || 13 Aug 2018 || 25 || align=left | Disc.: SDSS || 
|- id="2002 TG304" bgcolor=#E9E9E9
| 1 ||  || MBA-M || 18.7 || 1.0 km || multiple || 2002–2020 || 17 Oct 2020 || 43 || align=left | Disc.: SDSS || 
|- id="2002 TH304" bgcolor=#E9E9E9
| 0 ||  || MBA-M || 17.68 || 1.6 km || multiple || 2002–2022 || 06 Jan 2022 || 52 || align=left | Disc.: SDSSAdded on 17 January 2021 || 
|- id="2002 TN304" bgcolor=#E9E9E9
| 0 ||  || MBA-M || 18.00 || 1.4 km || multiple || 2002–2022 || 07 Jan 2022 || 69 || align=left | Disc.: SDSS || 
|- id="2002 TS304" bgcolor=#fefefe
| 0 ||  || MBA-I || 18.1 || data-sort-value="0.71" | 710 m || multiple || 2002–2021 || 15 Jan 2021 || 142 || align=left | Disc.: SDSS || 
|- id="2002 TU304" bgcolor=#fefefe
| 0 ||  || MBA-I || 18.90 || data-sort-value="0.49" | 490 m || multiple || 2002–2021 || 09 May 2021 || 46 || align=left | Disc.: SDSSAlt.: 2009 WJ219 || 
|- id="2002 TW304" bgcolor=#E9E9E9
| – ||  || MBA-M || 18.9 || data-sort-value="0.49" | 490 m || single || 26 days || 30 Oct 2002 || 8 || align=left | Disc.: SDSS || 
|- id="2002 TB305" bgcolor=#E9E9E9
| 0 ||  || MBA-M || 17.05 || 2.2 km || multiple || 2002–2022 || 25 Jan 2022 || 154 || align=left | Disc.: SDSS || 
|- id="2002 TJ305" bgcolor=#fefefe
| 1 ||  || MBA-I || 19.2 || data-sort-value="0.43" | 430 m || multiple || 2002–2015 || 08 Aug 2015 || 36 || align=left | Disc.: SDSS || 
|- id="2002 TO305" bgcolor=#E9E9E9
| 1 ||  || MBA-M || 18.1 || 1.3 km || multiple || 2002–2020 || 17 Oct 2020 || 28 || align=left | Disc.: SDSSAlt.: 2020 RY89 || 
|- id="2002 TR305" bgcolor=#d6d6d6
| – ||  || MBA-O || 18.2 || 1.3 km || single || 6 days || 10 Oct 2002 || 6 || align=left | Disc.: SDSS || 
|- id="2002 TV305" bgcolor=#E9E9E9
| – ||  || MBA-M || 19.4 || data-sort-value="0.39" | 390 m || single || 27 days || 31 Oct 2002 || 8 || align=left | Disc.: SDSS || 
|- id="2002 TX305" bgcolor=#E9E9E9
| 0 ||  || MBA-M || 18.39 || 1.2 km || multiple || 2002–2022 || 25 Jan 2022 || 53 || align=left | Disc.: SDSSAlt.: 2014 HC105 || 
|- id="2002 TB306" bgcolor=#fefefe
| 3 ||  || MBA-I || 19.6 || data-sort-value="0.36" | 360 m || multiple || 2002–2015 || 08 Nov 2015 || 19 || align=left | Disc.: SDSSAlt.: 2015 TU184 || 
|- id="2002 TC306" bgcolor=#d6d6d6
| 1 ||  || MBA-O || 17.7 || 1.6 km || multiple || 2002–2019 || 16 Jan 2019 || 43 || align=left | Disc.: SDSS || 
|- id="2002 TE306" bgcolor=#d6d6d6
| 0 ||  || MBA-O || 16.80 || 2.4 km || multiple || 2002–2021 || 26 Nov 2021 || 161 || align=left | Disc.: SDSS || 
|- id="2002 TG306" bgcolor=#E9E9E9
| 4 ||  || MBA-M || 17.9 || 1.5 km || multiple || 2002–2020 || 16 Aug 2020 || 18 || align=left | Disc.: SDSS || 
|- id="2002 TM306" bgcolor=#fefefe
| 1 ||  || MBA-I || 19.1 || data-sort-value="0.45" | 450 m || multiple || 1992–2019 || 31 Dec 2019 || 40 || align=left | Disc.: SDSS || 
|- id="2002 TN306" bgcolor=#d6d6d6
| 0 ||  || MBA-O || 16.7 || 2.5 km || multiple || 2002–2020 || 17 Dec 2020 || 63 || align=left | Disc.: SDSSAlt.: 2008 UJ183 || 
|- id="2002 TT306" bgcolor=#E9E9E9
| 0 ||  || MBA-M || 18.17 || 1.3 km || multiple || 2002–2021 || 28 Nov 2021 || 29 || align=left | Disc.: SDSS || 
|- id="2002 TU306" bgcolor=#fefefe
| 0 ||  || MBA-I || 18.2 || data-sort-value="0.68" | 680 m || multiple || 2000–2020 || 23 Dec 2020 || 56 || align=left | Disc.: SDSS || 
|- id="2002 TW306" bgcolor=#fefefe
| 1 ||  || MBA-I || 18.73 || data-sort-value="0.53" | 530 m || multiple || 2002–2019 || 10 Jan 2019 || 36 || align=left | Disc.: SDSS || 
|- id="2002 TA307" bgcolor=#E9E9E9
| 0 ||  || MBA-M || 18.5 || data-sort-value="0.84" | 840 m || multiple || 2002–2019 || 25 Sep 2019 || 39 || align=left | Disc.: SDSSAdded on 13 September 2020Alt.: 2002 TA386 || 
|- id="2002 TE307" bgcolor=#d6d6d6
| 0 ||  || MBA-O || 16.4 || 2.9 km || multiple || 2002–2021 || 17 Jan 2021 || 115 || align=left | Disc.: SDSS || 
|- id="2002 TQ307" bgcolor=#d6d6d6
| 0 ||  || MBA-O || 17.8 || 1.5 km || multiple || 2002–2019 || 02 Dec 2019 || 20 || align=left | Disc.: SDSS || 
|- id="2002 TR307" bgcolor=#d6d6d6
| 0 ||  || MBA-O || 16.68 || 2.6 km || multiple || 2002–2021 || 08 Apr 2021 || 122 || align=left | Disc.: SDSS || 
|- id="2002 TU307" bgcolor=#d6d6d6
| 0 ||  || MBA-O || 17.07 || 2.1 km || multiple || 2002–2021 || 11 May 2021 || 93 || align=left | Disc.: SDSSAlt.: 2010 BF57, 2015 DF158 || 
|- id="2002 TW307" bgcolor=#E9E9E9
| 2 ||  || MBA-M || 18.6 || 1.0 km || multiple || 2002-2020 || 14 Aug 2020 || 14 || align=left | Disc.: SDSS || 
|- id="2002 TX307" bgcolor=#E9E9E9
| 0 ||  || MBA-M || 16.9 || 1.8 km || multiple || 2002–2021 || 04 Jan 2021 || 127 || align=left | Disc.: SDSS || 
|- id="2002 TY307" bgcolor=#d6d6d6
| – ||  || MBA-O || 19.3 || data-sort-value="0.77" | 770 m || single || 24 days || 28 Oct 2002 || 10 || align=left | Disc.: SDSS || 
|- id="2002 TZ307" bgcolor=#fefefe
| 3 ||  || MBA-I || 18.6 || data-sort-value="0.57" | 570 m || multiple || 2002–2020 || 24 Dec 2020 || 25 || align=left | Disc.: SDSS || 
|- id="2002 TD308" bgcolor=#E9E9E9
| 0 ||  || MBA-M || 17.1 || 2.1 km || multiple || 1996–2020 || 05 Nov 2020 || 91 || align=left | Disc.: SDSSAlt.: 2007 VU157, 2014 EZ34, 2015 MV126 || 
|- id="2002 TF308" bgcolor=#fefefe
| 0 ||  || MBA-I || 18.34 || data-sort-value="0.64" | 640 m || multiple || 2002–2021 || 12 Jun 2021 || 105 || align=left | Disc.: SDSS || 
|- id="2002 TG308" bgcolor=#d6d6d6
| 0 ||  || MBA-O || 16.25 || 3.1 km || multiple || 2002–2021 || 11 May 2021 || 163 || align=left | Disc.: SDSSAlt.: 2013 WS50 || 
|- id="2002 TJ308" bgcolor=#E9E9E9
| 0 ||  || MBA-M || 17.6 || 1.3 km || multiple || 2002–2019 || 24 Aug 2019 || 58 || align=left | Disc.: SDSS || 
|- id="2002 TL308" bgcolor=#d6d6d6
| 0 ||  || MBA-O || 17.0 || 2.2 km || multiple || 2002–2020 || 20 Dec 2020 || 53 || align=left | Disc.: SDSS || 
|- id="2002 TN308" bgcolor=#E9E9E9
| 0 ||  || MBA-M || 17.9 || 1.1 km || multiple || 2002–2019 || 01 Jul 2019 || 35 || align=left | Disc.: SDSS || 
|- id="2002 TO308" bgcolor=#d6d6d6
| 0 ||  || MBA-O || 16.60 || 2.7 km || multiple || 2002–2021 || 13 May 2021 || 97 || align=left | Disc.: SDSSAlt.: 2013 WN72 || 
|- id="2002 TS308" bgcolor=#d6d6d6
| 1 ||  || MBA-O || 17.0 || 2.2 km || multiple || 2002–2019 || 02 Nov 2019 || 37 || align=left | Disc.: SDSSAlt.: 2008 VG69 || 
|- id="2002 TV308" bgcolor=#fefefe
| 0 ||  || MBA-I || 18.98 || data-sort-value="0.48" | 480 m || multiple || 2000–2021 || 27 Dec 2021 || 51 || align=left | Disc.: SDSS || 
|- id="2002 TW308" bgcolor=#d6d6d6
| 0 ||  || MBA-O || 16.7 || 2.5 km || multiple || 2002–2021 || 24 Jan 2021 || 78 || align=left | Disc.: SDSS || 
|- id="2002 TY308" bgcolor=#d6d6d6
| 1 ||  || MBA-O || 17.3 || 1.9 km || multiple || 2002–2019 || 24 Oct 2019 || 49 || align=left | Disc.: SDSS || 
|- id="2002 TD309" bgcolor=#E9E9E9
| 0 ||  || MBA-M || 17.9 || 1.1 km || multiple || 2002–2019 || 23 Oct 2019 || 85 || align=left | Disc.: SDSS || 
|- id="2002 TE309" bgcolor=#d6d6d6
| 0 ||  || MBA-O || 16.66 || 2.6 km || multiple || 2000–2021 || 03 Aug 2021 || 154 || align=left | Disc.: SDSSAlt.: 2010 GZ171 || 
|- id="2002 TG309" bgcolor=#d6d6d6
| 2 ||  || MBA-O || 17.75 || 1.6 km || multiple || 2002–2019 || 08 Jan 2019 || 24 || align=left | Disc.: SDSSAdded on 24 December 2021 || 
|- id="2002 TO309" bgcolor=#d6d6d6
| 0 ||  || MBA-O || 16.7 || 2.5 km || multiple || 2002–2020 || 23 Dec 2020 || 93 || align=left | Disc.: SDSSAlt.: 2008 WL29 || 
|- id="2002 TP309" bgcolor=#d6d6d6
| 1 ||  || MBA-O || 17.97 || 1.4 km || multiple || 2002–2021 || 10 Sep 2021 || 39 || align=left | Disc.: SDSSAdded on 21 August 2021Alt.: 2021 NS11 || 
|- id="2002 TQ309" bgcolor=#fefefe
| 0 ||  || MBA-I || 18.0 || data-sort-value="0.75" | 750 m || multiple || 2002–2020 || 17 Nov 2020 || 79 || align=left | Disc.: SDSS || 
|- id="2002 TX309" bgcolor=#d6d6d6
| 0 ||  || MBA-O || 16.9 || 2.3 km || multiple || 2002–2020 || 25 Apr 2020 || 75 || align=left | Disc.: SDSS || 
|- id="2002 TY309" bgcolor=#d6d6d6
| 0 ||  || MBA-O || 17.17 || 2.0 km || multiple || 2002–2021 || 18 Apr 2021 || 67 || align=left | Disc.: SDSS || 
|- id="2002 TF310" bgcolor=#fefefe
| 0 ||  || MBA-I || 18.54 || data-sort-value="0.58" | 580 m || multiple || 2002–2022 || 27 Jan 2022 || 74 || align=left | Disc.: SDSS || 
|- id="2002 TG310" bgcolor=#fefefe
| 0 ||  || MBA-I || 18.2 || data-sort-value="0.68" | 680 m || multiple || 2002–2019 || 20 Dec 2019 || 59 || align=left | Disc.: SDSS || 
|- id="2002 TJ310" bgcolor=#fefefe
| 0 ||  || MBA-I || 18.99 || data-sort-value="0.47" | 470 m || multiple || 2002–2021 || 08 Sep 2021 || 38 || align=left | Disc.: SDSSAdded on 22 July 2020Alt.: 2015 US42 || 
|- id="2002 TR310" bgcolor=#fefefe
| 0 ||  || MBA-I || 17.6 || data-sort-value="0.90" | 900 m || multiple || 2002–2021 || 12 Jun 2021 || 174 || align=left | Disc.: SDSS || 
|- id="2002 TU310" bgcolor=#E9E9E9
| 0 ||  || MBA-M || 17.1 || 2.1 km || multiple || 2002–2020 || 20 Oct 2020 || 109 || align=left | Disc.: SDSSAdded on 22 July 2020Alt.: 2010 OK8 || 
|- id="2002 TV310" bgcolor=#E9E9E9
| 0 ||  || MBA-M || 17.2 || 1.5 km || multiple || 2002–2021 || 14 Jan 2021 || 116 || align=left | Disc.: SDSS || 
|- id="2002 TA311" bgcolor=#fefefe
| 0 ||  || MBA-I || 18.72 || data-sort-value="0.54" | 540 m || multiple || 1992–2021 || 08 Apr 2021 || 63 || align=left | Disc.: SDSSAlt.: 2007 CY35 || 
|- id="2002 TD311" bgcolor=#d6d6d6
| 0 ||  || MBA-O || 16.87 || 2.4 km || multiple || 2002–2021 || 15 Apr 2021 || 74 || align=left | Disc.: SDSS || 
|- id="2002 TH311" bgcolor=#E9E9E9
| 0 ||  || MBA-M || 17.7 || 1.2 km || multiple || 2002–2019 || 19 Dec 2019 || 60 || align=left | Disc.: SDSS || 
|- id="2002 TS311" bgcolor=#E9E9E9
| – ||  || MBA-M || 19.4 || data-sort-value="0.39" | 390 m || single || 7 days || 11 Oct 2002 || 6 || align=left | Disc.: SDSS || 
|- id="2002 TH312" bgcolor=#fefefe
| 0 ||  || MBA-I || 19.3 || data-sort-value="0.41" | 410 m || multiple || 2002–2019 || 02 Nov 2019 || 26 || align=left | Disc.: SDSS || 
|- id="2002 TL312" bgcolor=#E9E9E9
| 0 ||  || MBA-M || 18.06 || 1.4 km || multiple || 2002–2022 || 27 Jan 2022 || 41 || align=left | Disc.: SDSS || 
|- id="2002 TU312" bgcolor=#d6d6d6
| 2 ||  || MBA-O || 17.7 || 1.6 km || multiple || 2002–2017 || 12 Sep 2017 || 19 || align=left | Disc.: SDSSAlt.: 2007 RW261 || 
|- id="2002 TW312" bgcolor=#d6d6d6
| 0 ||  || MBA-O || 16.4 || 2.9 km || multiple || 2002–2021 || 18 Jan 2021 || 85 || align=left | Disc.: SDSS || 
|- id="2002 TX312" bgcolor=#E9E9E9
| 0 ||  || MBA-M || 17.6 || 1.3 km || multiple || 2002–2019 || 29 Nov 2019 || 52 || align=left | Disc.: SDSS || 
|- id="2002 TZ312" bgcolor=#E9E9E9
| 0 ||  || MBA-M || 16.9 || 1.8 km || multiple || 2002–2021 || 10 Jan 2021 || 135 || align=left | Disc.: SDSS || 
|- id="2002 TB313" bgcolor=#E9E9E9
| 2 ||  || MBA-M || 17.9 || 1.5 km || multiple || 2002–2020 || 17 Nov 2020 || 36 || align=left | Disc.: SDSSAdded on 17 January 2021Alt.: 2015 PW154 || 
|- id="2002 TG313" bgcolor=#d6d6d6
| 0 ||  || MBA-O || 16.2 || 3.2 km || multiple || 2002–2021 || 18 Jan 2021 || 99 || align=left | Disc.: SDSS || 
|- id="2002 TK313" bgcolor=#d6d6d6
| 0 ||  || MBA-O || 15.86 || 3.7 km || multiple || 2002–2021 || 02 Apr 2021 || 166 || align=left | Disc.: SDSSAlt.: 2010 JD128, 2010 JV128, 2011 HJ22 || 
|- id="2002 TM313" bgcolor=#E9E9E9
| 0 ||  || MBA-M || 17.64 || 1.7 km || multiple || 2002–2022 || 27 Jan 2022 || 36 || align=left | Disc.: SDSSAdded on 21 August 2021Alt.: 2013 CG119 || 
|- id="2002 TP313" bgcolor=#d6d6d6
| 0 ||  || MBA-O || 16.7 || 2.5 km || multiple || 2002–2020 || 23 Jan 2020 || 65 || align=left | Disc.: SDSSAlt.: 2014 WD418 || 
|- id="2002 TQ313" bgcolor=#E9E9E9
| 2 ||  || MBA-M || 18.1 || 1.0 km || multiple || 2002–2021 || 16 Jan 2021 || 31 || align=left | Disc.: SDSSAdded on 9 March 2021 || 
|- id="2002 TR313" bgcolor=#d6d6d6
| 0 ||  || MBA-O || 16.2 || 3.2 km || multiple || 2002–2021 || 18 Jan 2021 || 88 || align=left | Disc.: SDSS || 
|- id="2002 TS313" bgcolor=#fefefe
| 0 ||  || MBA-I || 18.58 || data-sort-value="0.57" | 570 m || multiple || 2002–2021 || 10 May 2021 || 56 || align=left | Disc.: SDSSAdded on 22 July 2020 || 
|- id="2002 TT313" bgcolor=#E9E9E9
| 0 ||  || MBA-M || 17.3 || 1.9 km || multiple || 2002–2020 || 08 Nov 2020 || 72 || align=left | Disc.: SDSSAdded on 22 July 2020 || 
|- id="2002 TU313" bgcolor=#fefefe
| 0 ||  || HUN || 18.20 || data-sort-value="0.68" | 680 m || multiple || 2002–2022 || 15 Jan 2022 || 85 || align=left | Disc.: SDSS || 
|- id="2002 TY313" bgcolor=#E9E9E9
| 0 ||  || MBA-M || 18.27 || data-sort-value="0.93" | 930 m || multiple || 2002–2021 || 11 Apr 2021 || 69 || align=left | Disc.: SDSS || 
|- id="2002 TZ313" bgcolor=#E9E9E9
| 0 ||  || MBA-M || 17.19 || 2.0 km || multiple || 2002–2021 || 27 Dec 2021 || 104 || align=left | Disc.: SDSSAlt.: 2016 UV66 || 
|- id="2002 TC314" bgcolor=#E9E9E9
| 0 ||  || MBA-M || 17.50 || 1.8 km || multiple || 2002–2022 || 07 Jan 2022 || 84 || align=left | Disc.: SDSS || 
|- id="2002 TL314" bgcolor=#d6d6d6
| 0 ||  || MBA-O || 16.6 || 2.7 km || multiple || 2002–2021 || 12 Jan 2021 || 52 || align=left | Disc.: SDSS || 
|- id="2002 TM314" bgcolor=#d6d6d6
| 0 ||  || MBA-O || 16.97 || 2.2 km || multiple || 2002–2021 || 17 Apr 2021 || 71 || align=left | Disc.: SDSS || 
|- id="2002 TQ314" bgcolor=#E9E9E9
| 0 ||  || MBA-M || 17.7 || 1.2 km || multiple || 2002–2021 || 11 Jan 2021 || 71 || align=left | Disc.: SDSS || 
|- id="2002 TX314" bgcolor=#d6d6d6
| 0 ||  || MBA-O || 15.7 || 4.0 km || multiple || 1993–2021 || 18 Jan 2021 || 195 || align=left | Disc.: SDSS || 
|- id="2002 TA315" bgcolor=#E9E9E9
| 0 ||  || MBA-M || 16.93 || 2.3 km || multiple || 2002–2022 || 06 Jan 2022 || 150 || align=left | Disc.: SDSSAlt.: 2013 AX121 || 
|- id="2002 TB315" bgcolor=#E9E9E9
| 2 ||  || MBA-M || 18.18 || data-sort-value="0.65" | 1.0 km || multiple || 2002-2021 || 11 Apr 2021 || 19 || align=left | Disc.: SDSS || 
|- id="2002 TE315" bgcolor=#E9E9E9
| 0 ||  || MBA-M || 17.0 || 1.7 km || multiple || 2002–2019 || 20 Dec 2019 || 85 || align=left | Disc.: SDSSAlt.: 2014 MJ13 || 
|- id="2002 TJ315" bgcolor=#d6d6d6
| 3 ||  || MBA-O || 17.4 || 1.8 km || multiple || 2002–2019 || 28 Nov 2019 || 28 || align=left | Disc.: SDSS || 
|- id="2002 TK315" bgcolor=#E9E9E9
| 0 ||  || MBA-M || 17.33 || 1.0 km || multiple || 2002–2021 || 31 Mar 2021 || 95 || align=left | Disc.: SDSSAlt.: 2014 RZ31 || 
|- id="2002 TR315" bgcolor=#FA8072
| 1 ||  || MCA || 19.7 || data-sort-value="0.34" | 340 m || multiple || 2002–2018 || 04 Dec 2018 || 33 || align=left | Disc.: SDSSAdded on 11 May 2021Alt.: 2018 WR2 || 
|- id="2002 TU315" bgcolor=#d6d6d6
| 0 ||  || MBA-O || 16.43 || 2.9 km || multiple || 2002–2022 || 27 Jan 2022 || 95 || align=left | Disc.: SDSSAlt.: 2014 WZ298 || 
|- id="2002 TX315" bgcolor=#E9E9E9
| 0 ||  || MBA-M || 17.2 || 2.0 km || multiple || 2002–2020 || 20 Oct 2020 || 174 || align=left | Disc.: SDSSAlt.: 2013 AF177 || 
|- id="2002 TA316" bgcolor=#FA8072
| 2 ||  || MCA || 19.3 || data-sort-value="0.41" | 410 m || multiple || 2002–2015 || 17 Aug 2015 || 23 || align=left | Disc.: SDSS || 
|- id="2002 TD316" bgcolor=#E9E9E9
| 0 ||  || MBA-M || 17.8 || 1.2 km || multiple || 2002–2019 || 24 Sep 2019 || 53 || align=left | Disc.: SDSS || 
|- id="2002 TH316" bgcolor=#E9E9E9
| 0 ||  || MBA-M || 17.4 || 1.4 km || multiple || 2002–2021 || 17 Jan 2021 || 86 || align=left | Disc.: SDSS || 
|- id="2002 TL316" bgcolor=#d6d6d6
| 0 ||  || MBA-O || 17.30 || 1.9 km || multiple || 2002–2021 || 17 Apr 2021 || 62 || align=left | Disc.: SDSS || 
|- id="2002 TQ316" bgcolor=#E9E9E9
| 0 ||  || MBA-M || 17.8 || data-sort-value="0.82" | 820 m || multiple || 2002–2021 || 07 Jun 2021 || 63 || align=left | Disc.: SDSSAlt.: 2010 NU138, 2016 CJ216 || 
|- id="2002 TR316" bgcolor=#d6d6d6
| 0 ||  || MBA-O || 16.7 || 2.5 km || multiple || 2002–2020 || 26 Jan 2020 || 42 || align=left | Disc.: SDSS || 
|- id="2002 TS316" bgcolor=#d6d6d6
| 0 ||  || MBA-O || 17.11 || 2.1 km || multiple || 2002–2021 || 28 Oct 2021 || 70 || align=left | Disc.: SDSSAdded on 21 August 2021 || 
|- id="2002 TU316" bgcolor=#E9E9E9
| 0 ||  || MBA-M || 17.7 || 1.2 km || multiple || 2002–2019 || 01 Nov 2019 || 105 || align=left | Disc.: SDSSAlt.: 2015 UE80 || 
|- id="2002 TW316" bgcolor=#E9E9E9
| 0 ||  || MBA-M || 17.2 || 2.0 km || multiple || 2002–2020 || 11 Dec 2020 || 140 || align=left | Disc.: SDSS || 
|- id="2002 TY316" bgcolor=#fefefe
| 0 ||  || MBA-I || 17.44 || data-sort-value="0.97" | 970 m || multiple || 2002–2021 || 04 Dec 2021 || 259 || align=left | Disc.: SDSSAlt.: 2013 OW6 || 
|- id="2002 TJ317" bgcolor=#d6d6d6
| 0 ||  || MBA-O || 16.79 || 2.4 km || multiple || 1992–2021 || 14 Apr 2021 || 102 || align=left | Disc.: SDSS || 
|- id="2002 TB318" bgcolor=#E9E9E9
| 0 ||  || MBA-M || 17.27 || 2.0 km || multiple || 2002–2021 || 08 Dec 2021 || 131 || align=left | Disc.: SDSSAdded on 22 July 2020 || 
|- id="2002 TM318" bgcolor=#E9E9E9
| 0 ||  || MBA-M || 16.98 || 2.2 km || multiple || 2002–2022 || 25 Jan 2022 || 175 || align=left | Disc.: SDSSAlt.: 2013 AZ30 || 
|- id="2002 TO318" bgcolor=#d6d6d6
| 0 ||  || MBA-O || 16.8 || 2.4 km || multiple || 2002–2021 || 23 Jan 2021 || 49 || align=left | Disc.: SDSSAlt.: 2011 FL110, 2016 DQ12 || 
|- id="2002 TQ318" bgcolor=#d6d6d6
| 0 ||  || MBA-O || 16.8 || 2.4 km || multiple || 2002–2021 || 10 Feb 2021 || 42 || align=left | Disc.: SDSSAdded on 17 June 2021 || 
|- id="2002 TW318" bgcolor=#fefefe
| 0 ||  || MBA-I || 18.4 || data-sort-value="0.62" | 620 m || multiple || 2002–2017 || 22 Nov 2017 || 58 || align=left | Disc.: SDSSAlt.: 2017 VF17 || 
|- id="2002 TJ319" bgcolor=#d6d6d6
| 0 ||  || MBA-O || 16.39 || 2.9 km || multiple || 2002–2021 || 17 Apr 2021 || 148 || align=left | Disc.: SDSS || 
|- id="2002 TN319" bgcolor=#d6d6d6
| 0 ||  || MBA-O || 17.13 || 2.1 km || multiple || 2002–2021 || 07 Apr 2021 || 83 || align=left | Disc.: SDSS || 
|- id="2002 TQ319" bgcolor=#fefefe
| 0 ||  || MBA-I || 18.5 || data-sort-value="0.59" | 590 m || multiple || 2002–2021 || 14 Jan 2021 || 78 || align=left | Disc.: SDSSAlt.: 2009 UP54 || 
|- id="2002 TX319" bgcolor=#E9E9E9
| 0 ||  || MBA-M || 17.95 || 1.1 km || multiple || 2002–2021 || 17 Apr 2021 || 108 || align=left | Disc.: SDSSAlt.: 2008 CK171 || 
|- id="2002 TY319" bgcolor=#d6d6d6
| 0 ||  || MBA-O || 17.2 || 2.0 km || multiple || 2002–2021 || 15 Jan 2021 || 59 || align=left | Disc.: SDSS || 
|}
back to top

References 
 

Lists of unnumbered minor planets